= Royal Canadian Mint Olympic coins =

Commemorative coins of Canada

Since the 1976 Summer Olympics in Montreal, the Royal Canadian Mint has struck Summer and Winter Olympic coins to mark games held in Canada.

== History ==
One of the earliest numismatic collection was the Olympic five- and ten-dollar coins for the 1976 Montreal Olympics. Starting in 1973, the RCM issued four coin sets (two five-dollar coins and two ten-dollar coins). At the behest of the federal government, led by Prime Minister Pierre Elliott Trudeau, it was agreed that these coins would help finance while commemorate the 1976 Summer Olympics. The plan was to have thirty coins, twenty-eight silver coins with face values of $5 and $10, and two gold coins with face values of $100. They are the first of the modern Olympic coins with face values of one hundred dollars. Due to the incredibly high mintage (over 20 million coins were produced), these coins have no investment value whatsoever. Most of these coins today are usually sold for their silver content.

After the Olympic coin venture, the numismatic line expanded to include $100 gold coins. These were premium coins that sold for higher than face value. The common issue price from 1977 to 1979 ranged from $140 to $180. The cases for these coins tended to be brown or black leatherette cases with maroon or blue inserts, and a certificate of authenticity. Of all these coins, the only one that had any significant increase in value on the secondary market was the 2002 Alberta Strikes Oil coin.

Heading into the 1980s, the Olympics returned to Canada. The city of Calgary hosted the 1988 Winter Olympics. Starting in 1985, the federal government, under the leadership of Prime Minister Brian Mulroney, issued a ten-coin set to help finance and commemorate the Olympic games. These coins were issued in proof quality only and were sold with the partnership of the Royal Bank of Canada. Part of the agreement with Royal Bank was that these coins could be redeemed for their face value. Unlike the Montreal coins, mintage was limited to 5,000,000 coins; this would mark the first time that any silver coin had edge lettering on it, with the inscription reading "XV OLYMPIC WINTER GAMES – JEUX D'OLYMPIQUES D'HIVER"

On February 23, 2007, the Royal Canadian Mint held a press conference in Calgary, Alberta, to announce the release of the Vancouver Olympic commemorative coins. The denomination for the Vancouver Olympic coins is twenty-five dollars. The twenty-five dollar coins are the first modern Olympic coins ever to have a hologram on the reverse.

== 1976 Montreal Summer Games ==
Most numismatists agree that the first true numismatic collection was the Olympic five- and ten-dollar coins for the 1976 Montreal Olympics. Starting in February 1973, the Royal Canadian Mint (RCM) engaged in a very ambitious program. At the behest of the federal government, led by then-Prime Minister Pierre Elliott Trudeau, it was agreed that these coins would help finance and commemorate the 1976 Summer Olympics.

The plan was to have thirty coins, twenty-eight silver coins with face values of $5 and $10, and two gold coins. This would signify the first time that the RCM issued coins with face values of $5 and $10 since 1914. These coins would be categorized into seven series with each series configured into four coin sets (two five dollar coins and two ten dollar coins). The seven series were constituted as follows:

- Geographic
- Olympic Motifs
- Early Canadian Sports
- Olympic Track and Field Sports
- Olympic Water Sports
- Olympic Team and Body Contact Sports
- Olympic Souvenirs

The $10 denomination coins have a gross weight of 48.600 grams while the $5 denomination coins have a gross weight of 24.300 grams. Each coin is 92.5% silver for a net silver weight of 44.955 grams (1.4453 troy ounces) and 22.478 grams (0.7227 troy ounces) of silver respectively.

A key highlight of these coins were the standardized designs and the unique finishes. All 28 coins were styled in a similar fashion. The top aspect of the coin had the Olympic logo, its denomination, and the wording in the same spot. The finishes consisted of two different styles that had never been used on Canadian coinage. The first finish was a satin or frosted effect which adorned the coin. The second finish was a proof finish, which consisted of frosted lettering and a design set off against a brilliant mirror field. The RCM had to obtain special equipment to achieve the desired finish.

A very limited number of the $5 and $10 coins were initially sold by the bank in styrofoam packing and the coins were NOT encapsulated. The coins could be purchased loose, and individually

=== 1976 Montreal Olympic Coins ===
==== Series 1 ====
Year	Coin number	Face value	Theme	Artist	Mintage	Issue price (encapsulated)	Issue price (standard case)
1973	1	10 dollars	Map of World	Georges Huel	543,098	$12.00	$14.00
1973	2	5 dollars	Map of North America	Georges Huel	537,898	$6.00	$7.50
1973	3	10 dollars	Montreal Skyline	Georges Huel	Included in mintage of coin 1	$12.00	$14.00
1973	4	5 dollars	Kingston and Sailboats	Georges Huel	Included in mintage of coin 2	$6.00	$7.50

==== Series 2 ====
Year	Coin number	Face value	Theme	Artist	Mintage	Issue price (encapsulated)	Issue price (standard case)
1974	5	10 dollars	Head of Zeus	Anthony Mann	1,990,570	$15.00	$17.00
1974	6	5 dollars	Athlete with Torch	Anthony Mann	1,974,939	$7.50	$9.00
1974	7	10 dollars	Temple of Zeus	Anthony Mann	Included in mintage of coin 5	$15.00	$17.00
1974	8	5 dollars	Olympic Rings and Wreath	Anthony Mann	Included in mintage of coin 6	$7.50	$9.00

==== Series 3 ====
Year	Coin number	Face value	Theme	Artist	Mintage	Issue price (encapsulated)	Issue price (standard case)
1974	9	10 dollars	Lacrosse	Ken Danby	1,990,570	$15.75	$17.00
1974	10	5 dollars	Canoeing	Ken Danby	1,974,939	$8.00	$9.00
1974	11	10 dollars	Cycling	Ken Danby	Included in mintage of coin 9	$15.75	$17.00
1974	12	5 dollars	Rowing	Ken Danby	Included in mintage of coin 10	$8.00	$9.00

==== Series 4 ====
Year	Coin number	Face value	Theme	Artist	Mintage	Issue price (encapsulated)	Issue price (standard case)
1975	13	10 dollars	Men's Hurdles	Leo Yerxa	1,985,000	$15.75	$17.00
1975	14	5 dollars	Marathon	Leo Yerxa	2,476,217	$8.00	$9.00
1975	15	10 dollars	Women's Shot Put	Leo Yerxa	Included in mintage of coin 13	$15.75	$17.00
1975	16	5 dollars	Women's Javelin	Leo Yerxa	Included in mintage of coin 14	$8.00	$9.00

==== Series 5 ====
Year	Coin number	Face value	Theme	Artist	Mintage	Issue price (encapsulated)	Issue price (standard case)
1975	17	10 dollars	Paddling	Lynda Cooper	1,985,000	$15.75	$17.00
1975	18	5 dollars	Diving	Lynda Cooper	2,476,217	$8.00	$9.00
1975	19	10 dollars	Sailing	Lynda Cooper	Included in mintage of coin 17	$15.75	$17.00
1975	20	5 dollars	Swimming	Lynda Cooper	Included in mintage of coin 18	$8.00	$9.00

==== Series 6 ====
Year	Coin number	Face value	Theme	Artist	Mintage	Issue price (encapsulated)	Issue price (standard case)
1976	21	10 dollars	Field Hockey	Shigeo Fukada	1,887,630	$15.75	$17.00
1976	22	5 dollars	Fencing	Shigeo Fukada	1,985,257	$8.00	$9.00
1976	23	10 dollars	Soccer	Shigeo Fukada	Included in mintage of coin 21	$15.75	$17.00
1976	24	5 dollars	Boxing	Shigeo Fukada	Included in mintage of coin 22	$8.00	$9.00

==== Series 7 ====
Year	Coin number	Face value	Theme	Artist	Mintage	Issue price (encapsulated)	Issue price (standard case)
1976	25	10 dollars	Olympic Stadium	Elliott John Morrison	1,887,629	$15.75	$17.00
1976	26	5 dollars	Olympic Village	Elliott John Morrison	1,985,257	$8.00	$9.00
1976	27	10 dollars	Olympic Velodrome	Elliott John Morrison	Included in mintage of coin 25	$15.75	$17.00
1976	28	5 dollars	Olympic Flame	Elliott John Morrison	Included in mintage of coin 26	$8.00	$9.00

==== 100 dollar gold ====
Year	Theme	Artist	Mintage	Issue price
1976	Olympic Commemorative (14 karat)	Dora de Pédery-Hunt	650,000	$105.00
1976	Olympic Commemorative (22 karat)	Dora de Pédery-Hunt	350,000	$150.00

== 1988 Calgary Winter Games ==
Heading into the 1980s, the Olympics would return to Canada. The city of Calgary would host the 1988 Winter Olympics. Starting in 1985, the Federal Government, under the leadership of then-Prime Minister Brian Mulroney, issued a ten coin set to help finance and commemorate the Olympic games. In similar style to the Montreal Olympics, the RCM would introduce coins with a face value that had never been used before. Said coins would feature a $20 face value. These coins were issued in Proof quality only, and were sold with the partnership of the Royal Bank of Canada. Unlike the Montreal coins, mintage was limited to 5,000,000 coins and this would mark the first time that any silver coin had edge lettering on it. Said lettering was 'XV OLYMPIC WINTER GAMES - JEUX D'OLYMPIQUES D'HIVER.' There are existing varieties that have missed the edge lettering process. The 10 coins were also available in a green felt case with an Olympic logo on the outside and a Royal Canadian Mint medallion on the inside. The cost was $370. The medallion could be removed and the gold coin, offered separately, could be placed into its place. The numbered and signed Certificate of Authenticity was included in the cases internal cover recess. The entire case was fit into a white cardboard sleeve with the Olympic logo on the outside.

=== 1988 Calgary Olympic Coins ===
Year	Series	Sport	Artist	Mintage	Issue price	Face	Weight	Composition
1985	First Series	Downhill Skiing	Ian Stewart	406,360	$37.00	$20	34.107 grams	92.5% Ag/7.5% Cu
1985	First Series	Speed Skating	Friedrich Peter	354,222	$37.00	$20	34.107 grams	92.5% Ag/7.5% Cu
1986	Second Series	Hockey	Ian Stewart	396,602	$37.00	$20	34.107 grams	92.5% Ag/7.5% Cu
1986	Second Series	Biathlon	John Mardon	308,086	$37.00	$20	34.107 grams	92.5% Ag/7.5% Cu
1986	Third Series	Cross-Country Skiing	Ian Stewart	303,199	$39.50	$20	34.107 grams	92.5% Ag/7.5% Cu
1986	Third Series	Free-Style Skiing	Walter Ott	294,322	$39.50	$20	34.107 grams	92.5% Ag/7.5% Cu
1986	Fourth Series	Ski-Jumping	Raymond Taylor	334,875	$39.50	$20	34.107 grams	92.5% Ag/7.5% Cu
1986	Fourth Series	Curling	Ian Stewart	286,457	$39.50	$20	34.107 grams	92.5% Ag/7.5% Cu
1987	Fifth Series	Figure Skating	Raymond Taylor	290,954	$42.00	$20	34.107 grams	92.5% Ag/7.5% Cu
1987	Fifth Series	Bobsleigh	John Mardon	274,326	$42.00	$20	34.107 grams	92.5% Ag/7.5% Cu

==== One hundred dollar gold ====
Year	Theme	Artist	Mintage	Issue price	Face value	Weight	Composition
1987	XV Olympic Winter Games	Friedrich Peter	145,175	$255.00	$100	13.338 grams	58.33% Au/41.67% Ag

== Olympic Centennial ==
The International Olympic Committee decided to commemorate the Centennial of the Olympic Games by issuing a coin set. This was a collaborative effort with five Mints contributing coins. The first three coins were issued by the RCM in 1992. The other Mints included Austria, Australia, France, and Greece.

Two of the coins were silver with a face value of $15 while the third coin was gold and had a face value of $175. The $15 coins were sold individually or in a set. The individual coins were packaged in a burgundy leatherette case while the set was featured in a wooden display case. Both $15 coins featured lettering on its edge: CITIUS, ALTIUS, FORTIUS. The $175 coin featured a Certificate of Authenticity signed by Juan Antonio Samaranch. The lettering on its edge was the same as the lettering found on the silver coins. There are a few very rare examples of these coins with a plain edge (no edge lettering). These plain edge coins were once held by the investment firm responsible for the $50 million Ohio Coingate Scandal.

=== 100th anniversary coins ===
Year	Theme	Artist	Mintage	Face value	Issue price	Weight	Composition
1992	Speed Skater, Pole Vaulter, Gymnast	David Craig	105,645	$15.00	$46.95	36.63 grams	92.5% Ag
1992	Speed Skater, Pole Vaulter, Gymnast - Plain Edge Variety	David Craig	Less than 25	$15.00	$46.95	36.63 grams	92.5% Ag
1992	Spirit of the Generations	Stewart Sherwood	Included in mintage of first coin	$15.00	$46.95	36.63 grams	92.5% Ag
1992	Flame	Stewart Sherwood	22,092	$175.00	$429.75	16.97 grams	91.6% Au/8.4% Ag

== 2004-2016 Olympics ==
=== Circulation coins ===
==== Lucky Loonie ====
For the first time, the 2010 Olympic Lucky Loonie does not have a loon on it, instead has the 2010 Vancouver winter Olympic symbol ilanaaq, an inukshuk.

Year	Theme	Artist	Mintage
2004	Lucky Loonie	R.R. Carmichael	6,526,000
2006	Lucky Loonie	Jean-Luc Grondin	10,495,000
2008	Lucky Loonie	Jean-Luc Grondin	10,841,000
2010	Lucky Loonie	Susanna Blunt	10,250,000
2012	Lucky Loonie	Emily S. Damstra	5,000,000
2014	Lucky Loonie	Emily S. Damstra	5,000,000
2016	Lucky Loonie	Derek Wicks	5,000,000

==== First Strikes ====
Year	Theme	Mintage	Issue price
2006	Lucky Loonie	20,010	$15.95

=== Numismatic coins ===
Year	Theme	Artist	Mintage	Issue price	Special notes
2002	Centre Ice Coin	R.R. Carmichael	25,000	$54.95	This coin was to commemorate Canada's Olympic Hockey Gold Medal Victory in Men's and Women's Hockey at the 2002 Salt Lake City Winter Olympics. It was part of the Going for the Gold Set, which included Olympic stamps and MacLean's magazine. Another feature of the coin was that it was a double dated coin featuring the years 1987 (to recognize the first year of production) and 2002.
2004	Sterling Silver Lucky Loonie	R.R. Carmichael, RCM Staff	19,941	$39.95.	To commemorate 2004 Athens Olympics
2006	Sterling Silver Lucky Loonie	Jean-Luc Grondin	19,956	$39.	To commemorate 2006 Torino Olympics

== 2010 Vancouver Olympics ==
=== Circulation Coins ===
The Vancouver 2010 Olympic Circulation Coin Program consists of 17 coins: 15 quarters and 2 Loonies. The D.G. Regina inscription will be removed from the Queen's effigy, making the 25-cent coins one of the few "godless circulating coins", a rare event in Canadian coinage. The first circulating $1 coin will be dated 2008 but the obverse will be the standard effigy of Queen Elizabeth II by Susanna Blunt with the wording "ELIZABETH II" and "D.G. REGINA" with the Circle M privy mark.

- 2007 Five different Olympic commemoratives were minted for circulation.

Year	Sport	Artist	Mintage	Release date
2007	Curling	Glen Green	22,400,000	February 24
2007	Ice Hockey	Glen Green	22,400,000	April 4
2007	Wheelchair curling	Glen Green	22,400,000	July 11
2007	Biathlon	Glen Green	22,400,000	September 12
2007	Alpine Skiing	Glen Green	22,400,000	October 24

All of these coins were also made available at service stations, encapsulated on a credit card-sized card. Many pressings of the Alpine Skiing coin released to service stations and to special 2010 Winter Olympic "coin boards" in October 2007 were the victim of a pressing error called a mule, with a 2008 obverse accidentally minted rather than the expected 2007. According to the Royal Canadian Mint, "sports cards" and 10,000 "coin board" sets were released with the error before it was caught.[note: the 2007 Alpine Skiing colour quarters were later struck with the correct 2007 die]. A similar mule occurred with the Wheelchair Curling issue, with an obverse featuring the standard Vancouver 2010 logo being used instead of the Paralympic logo. Both coins subsequently found demand in the collectors market. 2009 bobsleigh mules have also been found in circulation and colourized carded coins.

- 2008 Three different Olympic commemoratives were minted for circulation.

Year	Sport	Artist	Mintage	Release date
2008	Snowboarding	Glen Green	22,400,000	February 20
2008	Freestyle Skiing	Glen Green	22,400,000	April 16
2008	Figure Skating	Glen Green	22,400,000	November 18

- 2009 Five different Olympic commemoratives are planned for circulation. The proposed medalist coins are now the Olympic moments coins, and three million of each moments coins will have red colouring.

Year	Sport	Artist	Mintage	Release date
2009	Cross Country Skiing	Glen Green	22,400,000	January 15
2009	Speed Skating	Glen Green	22,400,000	March 12
2009	Bobsleigh	Glen Green	22,400,000	June 23
2009	Men's Ice Hockey	Jason Bouwman	22,000,000	September 29
2009	Men's Ice Hockey (colour)	Jason Bouwman	2,800,000	September 29
2009	Men's Ice Hockey (colour engraved 2)	Jason Bouwman	200,000	September 29
2009	Women's Ice Hockey	Jason Bouwman	22,000,000	November 17
2009	Women's Ice Hockey (colour)	Jason Bouwman	3,000,000	November 17

- 2010 Two different Olympic commemoratives are planned for circulation.

Year	Sport	Artist	Mintage	Release date
2010	Cindy Klassen	Jason Bouwman	22,000,000	January 5
2010	Cindy Klassen (colour)	Jason Bouwman	3,000,000	January 5
2010	Ice sledge hockey	Glen Green	22,400,000	March 18

==== Twenty-Five Cents ====
===== First Strikes =====
Year	Sport	Artist	Mintage	Issue price	Release date
2007	Curling	Glen Green	10,000	$15.95	February 24
2007	Ice Hockey	Glen Green	10,000	$15.95	April 4
2007	Wheelchair curling	Glen Green	10,000	$15.95	July 11
2007	Biathlon	Glen Green	10,000	$15.95	September 12
2007	Alpine Skiing	Glen Green	10,000	$15.95	October 24
2008	Snowboarding	Glen Green	10,000	$15.95	February 20
2008	Freestyle Skiing	Glen Green	10,000	$15.95	April 16
2009	Bobsleigh	Glen Green	10,000	$16.95	June 23

==== Special Edition Coin rolls ====
- As these rolls were sold directly from the Royal Canadian Mint in a special red paper wrapping.

Year	Sport	Artist	Mintage	Issue price	Release date
2007	Curling	Glen Green	10,000	$16.95	February 24
2007	Ice Hockey	Glen Green	10,000	$16.95	April 4
2007	Paralympic Curling	Glen Green	10,000	$16.95	July 11
2007	Biathlon	Glen Green	10,000	$16.95	September 12
2007	Alpine Skiing	Glen Green	10,000	$16.95	October 24
2008	Snowboarding	Glen Green	10,000	$16.95	February 20
2008	Freestyle Skiing	Glen Green	10,000	$16.95	April 16
2009	Bobsleigh	Glen Green	10,000	$16.95	June 23

==== Special edition uncirculated coin sets ====
Year	Mintage	Issue price
2007	30,000	$23.95
2008	30,000	$23.95
2009	30,000	$23.95

=== Numismatic coins ===
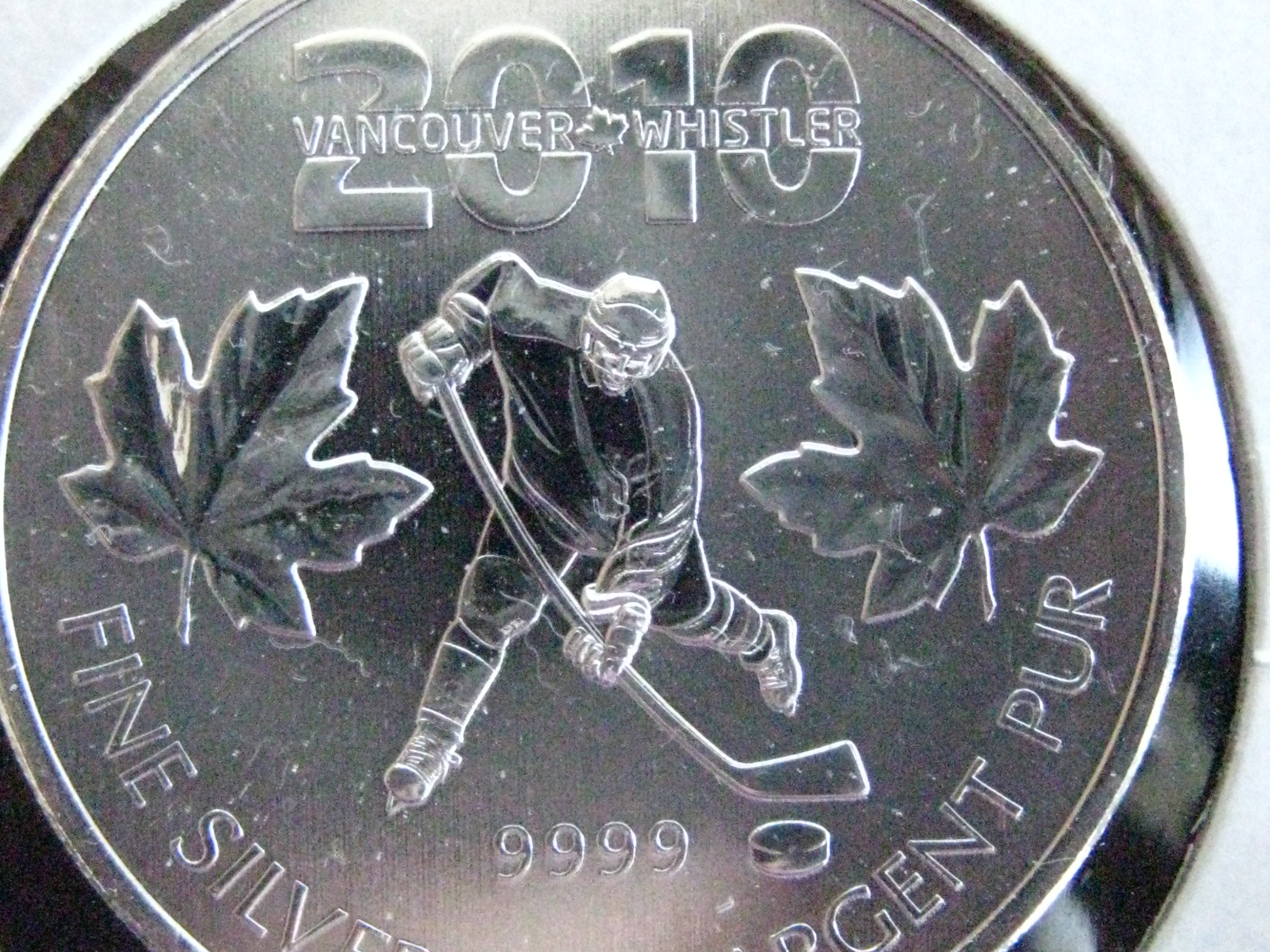
2010 Vancouver Olympics .9999 silver bullion maple leaf commemorative coin

==== Special edition proof dollars ====
Year	Theme	Composition	Weight	Finish	Artist	Mintage	Issue price
2010	2010 Vancouver Olympics: The Sun	92.5% silver, 7.5% copper	30 grams	Frosted relief on a proof-like field	Xwa lack tun (Rick Harry)	5,000	139.95

==== Twenty-Five dollars ====
===== Specifications =====
Composition	Finish	Weight (grams)	Diameter (mm)	Special notes
92.5% silver, 7.5% copper	Proof (with hologram on reverse)	27.78	40	First ever holographic coin collection for the Olympic Winter Games

Year	Sport	Artist	Mintage	Issue price	Release date
2007	Curling	Steve Hepburn	45,000	$69.95	February 24
2007	Ice Hockey	Steve Hepburn	45,000	$69.95	April 4
2007	Athletes Pride	Shelagh Armstrong	45,000	$69.95	July 11
2007	Biathlon	Bonnie Ross	45,000	$69.95	September 12
2007	Alpine Skiing	Brian Hughes	45,000	$69.95	October 24
2008	Snowboarding	Steve Hepburn	45,000	$71.95	February 20
2008	Freestyle Skiing	John Mardon	45,000	$71.95	April 16
2008	Home of 2010 Winter Games	Shelagh Armstrong	45,000	$71.95	July 23
2008	Figure Skating	Steve Hepburn	45,000	$71.95	September 10
2009	Bobsleigh	Bonnie Ross	45,000	$71.95	June 23
2009	Speed Skating	Tony Bianco	45,000	$71.95	February 18
2009	Cross Country Skiing	TBD	45,000	$71.95	April 15
2009	Olympic Spirit	TBD	45,000	TBD	July 22
2009	Skeleton	TBD	45,000	TBD	September 9
2009	Ski Jumping	TBD	45,000	TBD	October 7

==== Seventy-five dollars ====
===== Specifications =====
Composition	Finish	Weight (grams)	Diameter (mm)	Special notes
58.33% gold, 41.67% silver	Proof (with colour on reverse)	12	27	Canadian Culture, Wildlife, and Winter Games themes

Year	Design	Artist	Mintage	Issue price	Release date
2007	RCMP	Cecily Mok	8,000	$389.95	February 24
2007	Athletes Pride	Shelagh Armstrong	8,000	$389.95	July 11
2007	Canada Geese	Kerri Burnett	8,000	$389.95	October 24
2008	Four Host First Nations	Jody Broomfield	8,000	$409.95	February 20
2008	Home of 2010 Winter Games	Shelagh Armstrong	8,000	$409.95	July 23
2008	Inukshuk	Catherine Deer	8,000	$409.95	October 29
2009	Wolf	Arnold Nogy	8,000	$433.95	February 18
2009	Olympic Spirit	TBD	TBD	TBD	June 17
2009	Moose	TBD	TBD	TBD	September 9

==== Two hundred and fifty dollars ====
===== Specifications =====
Composition	Finish	Weight (grams)	Diameter (mm)	Special notes
99.99% pure silver	Proof	1,000	101.6	First time that RCM has produced a pure silver coin with guaranteed weight of 1 kilo

Year	Design	Artist	Mintage	Issue price
2007	Early Canada	Stan Witten	2,500	$1,299.95
2008	Towards Confederation	Susan Taylor	2,500	$1,599.95
2009	Surviving the Flood	Royal Canadian Mint Engravers	1,500	$1,599.95

==== Three hundred dollars ====
===== Specifications =====
Composition	Finish	Weight (grams)	Diameter (mm)	Special notes
58.33% gold, 41.67% silver	Proof (bullion on reverse)	60	50	Repeated on each coin is a circle of sculpted faces looking into three different central designs

Year	Design	Artist	Mintage	Issue price
2007	Olympic Ideals	David Craig (inner design), Laurie McGaw (outer ring design)	2,500	$1,499.95
2008	Competition	David Craig (inner design), Laurie McGaw (outer ring design)	2,500	$1,565.95
2009	Friendship	TBD	TBD	TBD

==== Two thousand five hundred dollars ====
===== Specifications =====
Composition	Finish	Weight (grams)	Diameter (mm)	Special notes
99.99% pure gold	Proof	1,000	101.6	First time that RCM has produced a pure gold coin with guaranteed weight of 1 kilo

Year	Design	Artist	Mintage	Issue price
2007	Early Canada	Stan Witten	20	$36,000.00
2008	Towards Confederation	Susan Taylor	20	$49,000.00
2009	Surviving the Flood	Royal Canadian Mint Engravers	40	$49,000.00

=== Bullion Coins ===
The Royal Canadian Mint and the International Olympic Committee have reached an agreement on Olympic Gold and Silver Maple Leaf coins. The announcement was made on August 3, 2007 and the agreement allows the RCM to strike bullion coins with the emblems of the 2010 Olympic and Paralympic Games. The issue will consist of two coins: one Gold Maple Leaf coin and a Canadian Silver Maple Leaf coin and both coins will feature the date of 2008. The new agreement means that the RCM is now selling Olympic coins through all of its major business lines: bullion, circulation, numismatics.

== 2010 Winter Paralympics ==
Two commemorative circulation coins for the 2010 Winter Paralympics were issued. They are listed on the above chart but are also listed separately for easier reference.

=== Specifications ===
Years	Weight	Diameter	Composition
2007–present	4.4 g	23.88 mm	94.0% steel, 3.8% copper, 2.2% nickel plating

=== Details ===
Date of Issue	Sport	Artist	Mintage
July 11, 2007	Wheelchair curling	Glen Green	22,400,000
March 18, 2010	Ice sledge hockey	Glen Green	22,400,000

== Both 2010 Winter Games ==
=== Mascot Coins ===
Each Mascot coin features each of the Vancouver 2010 Olympic and Paralympic mascots: Miga, Quatchi and Sumi. But no coin features Mukmuk, a "sidekick" of these mascots.

Year	Mascot	Diameter	Weight	Issue price
2008	Miga	23.88mm	4.4 g	$15.95
2008	Quatchi	23.88mm	4.4 g	$15.95
2008	Sumi	23.88mm	4.4 g	$15.95

=== Mascot Sport Poses ===
Each Mascot sport pose coin features either or both Miga and Quatchi and single Sumi. But no coin features Mukmuk, a "sidekick" of these mascots. All coins had a face value of 50 cents, were packaged in a plastic sleeve, and the issue price was $9.95.

Mascot	Sport pose
Miga	Alpine skiing
Quatchi and Miga	Bobsleigh
Quatchi and Miga	Figure skating
Miga	Ice Hockey
Quatchi	Ice Hockey
Quatchi	Parallel Giant Slalom
Sumi	Paralympic Alpine Skiing
Sumi	Paralympic Sledge Hockey
Miga	Skeleton
Miga	Ski Aerials
Quatchi	Snowboard Cross

== See also ==
- Modern Olympic coins
- Modern Olympic Coins (2000-present)
- Modern Winter Olympic coins
