= International Year of Older Persons =

United Nations designation for 1999

In its Proclamation on Aging, the United Nations General Assembly decided to declare 1999 as the International Year of Older Persons (IYOP). The proclamation was launched on 1 October 1998, the International Day of Older Persons, by United Nations Secretary General Kofi Annan.

Worldwide, within the next generations, the proportion of the population aged 60 and over will increase from one in four, bringing about significant social, economic and spiritual change. The proclamation was meant to draw attention to the recognition of humanity's demographic coming of age and the promise it holds for maturing attitudes and capabilities in social, economic, cultural and spiritual undertakings, not least for global peace and development in the next century.

Numerous events took place within the UN and in member countries to mark the event.

== Theme ==
With these transformations in mind, the UN chose "towards a society for All Ages" to serve as the theme for IYOP. Throughout the year, participating countries will foster awareness of seniors' roles in society and the need for intergenerational respect and support, emphasizing the fact that older persons are the repository of their societies' histories.

The theme of this International Year, however, elicits the full engagement of all segments of society. It calls for "solidarity", "respect" and "exchanges" between generations. It calls for opportunities to share between the young and the not-so-young such that each may learn from the other.

== History ==
Since 1959, World Refugee Year, the UN has designated specific years in order to draw attention to important issues. Governments of Member States, assisted by civil society, are encouraged to take the themes as opportunities to raise awareness and promote policy initiatives among citizens (The same rationale is applied to a lengthy list of annual days and special decades).

The work of many UN Agencies and programmes has direct connections with aging issues and will reflect IYOP priorities. That is certainly true for the World Health Organization (WHO), the United Nations Centre for Human Settlements (Habitat) and the United Nations Educational, Scientific and Cultural Organization (UNESCO).

In 1992 the United Nations General Assembly decided, "in recognition of humanity’s demographic coming of age and the promise it holds for maturing attitudes and capabilities in social, economic, cultural and spiritual undertakings, not least for global peace and development in the next century" (resolution 47/5), to declare 1999 as the International Year of Older Persons (IYOP). The theme of this year is Towards a society for all ages.

At the launching ceremony, the WHO called upon policy-makers to recognise the importance of population ageing and put this recognition into action. In 1999, there were some 580 million people aged 60 years and over in the world. By 2020, this number is estimated to pass over the 1 billion mark. By that time, over 700 million older people will live in developing countries alone. It was therefore indispensable to bring ageing into the development agenda, she emphasized.

== United Nations Principles for Older Persons ==
The underlying framework for the International Year of Older Persons is the International Plan of Action on Aging, the first major international instrument on aging which was endorsed by the General Assembly in 1982 (following the World Assembly on Aging of that year).

The subsequent UN Principles for Older Persons, adopted by the UN General Assembly on 16 December 1991 (resolution 46/91) may be divided into five different clusters of relevant issues: independence, participation, care, self-fulfillment and dignity.

Working within that framework, the focus of this year has been developed into four themes: the situation of older persons, individual lifelong development, relationships between the generations and, finally, the interrelationship of population aging and development.

=== Independence ===
- 1. Older persons should have access to adequate food, water, shelter, clothing and health care through the provision of income, family and community support and self-help.
- 2. Older persons should have the opportunity to work or to have access to other income-generating opportunities.
- 3. Older persons should be able to participate in determining when and at what pace withdrawal from the labour force takes place.
- 4. Older persons should have access to appropriate educational and training programmes.
- 5. Older persons should be able to live in environments that are safe and adaptable to personal preferences and changing capacities.
- 6. Older persons should be able to reside at home for as long as possible.

=== Participation ===
- 7. Older persons should remain integrated in society, participate actively in the formulation and implementation of policies that directly affect their well-being and share their knowledge and skills with younger generations.
- 8. Older persons should be able to seek and develop opportunities for service to the community and to serve as volunteers in positions appropriate to their interests and capabilities.
- 9. Older persons should be able to form movements or associations of older persons.

=== Care ===
- 10. Older persons should benefit from family and community care and protection in accordance with each society's system of cultural values.
- 11. Older persons should have access to health care to help them to maintain or regain the optimum level of physical, mental and emotional well- being and to prevent or delay the onset of illness.
- 12. Older persons should have access to social and legal services to enhance their autonomy, protection and care.
- 13. Older persons should be able to utilize appropriate levels of institutional care providing protection, rehabilitation and social and mental stimulation in a humane and secure environment.
- 14. Older persons should be able to enjoy human rights and fundamental freedoms when residing in any shelter, care or treatment facility, including full respect for their dignity, beliefs, needs and privacy and for the right to make decisions about their care and the quality of their lives.

=== Self-fulfillment ===
- 15. Older persons should be able to pursue opportunities for the full development of their potential.
- 16. Older persons should have access to the educational, cultural, spiritual and recreational resources of society.

=== Dignity ===
- 17. Older persons should be able to live in dignity and security and be free of exploitation and physical or mental abuse.
- 18. Older persons should be treated fairly regardless of age, gender, racial or ethnic background, disability or other status, and be valued independently of their economic contribution.

== IYOP commemorative coins and stamps ==
In Canada, the Division of Aging and Seniors of Health Canada played a lead role, along with similar offices established in every provincial jurisdiction. There were concerted efforts on the part of many seniors organizations, for whom the year provided a tremendous focal point around which to advance their concerns and aspirations. As a way to commemorate the event, Canada produced a commemorative coin and stamp. Both were designed by Shelagh Armstrong.

Country	Year	Denomination	Manufacturer	Artist	Mintage	Issue Price
Canada	1999	1 Dollar	Royal Canadian Mint	S. Armstrong-Hodgins	24,976	$49.95
Spain	1999	100 Pesetas	Madrid Mint		60,332,000	Face Value

Date of Issue	Manufacturer	Theme	Artist	Denomination	Printer	Quantity	Perforation
12 April 1999	Canada Post	Canada's International Year of Older Persons	S. Armstrong-Hodgins	46 cents	Canadian Bank Note Company, Limited	8,000,000	13.5

In 1999, the Royal Australian Mint issued a commemorative one dollar coin celebrating the IYOP.

== See also ==
- United Nations International Years
