= Leo Yerxa =

Canadian visual artist and writer

Leo Yerxa is a Canadian visual artist, medallist, and writer. As an illustrator of children's picture books he won the Governor General's Award in 2006. He lived in Ottawa, Ontario, then. He died on September 1, 2017.

== Early life and education ==
Yerxa was born in 1947 on the Little Eagle Reserve, Couchiching First Nation, in northwestern Ontario. He studied graphic arts at Algonquin College (Ottawa), and fine arts at the University of Waterloo (Waterloo, Ontario).

== Career ==
Yerxa began publishing poetry and participating in group art shows in the 1970s, and had his first one-man gallery show at the Thunder Bay National Exhibition Centre and Centre for Indian Art, entitled "Renegade: The Art of Leo Yerxa", 1984.

Yerxa's designs were used for the Series Four 1975 (1976) Summer Olympic Coins. The coins bearing his designs included $5: Marathon Runner; $5: Women's Javelin; $10: Women's Shot Put; and $10: Men's Hurdles. His use of Algonquin art motifs in the design of these coins is considered an early example of Canadian public art expressions of indigenous values and aesthetics.

Yerxa is the author or several books for children, including the critically acclaimed Ancient Thunder. for which he received a Governor General's Literary Award in 2006. and Last Leaf, First Snowflake to Fall,

== Visual arts ==
=== Group exhibitions ===
- 1974 CANADIAN INDIAN ART '74, Royal Ontario Museum, Toronto, Ontario.
- 1977 Links to Tradition, Bureau of Indian Affairs and Development.
- 1982 Renewal : Masterpiece s of contemporary Indian art from the Museum of Man, organised by Thunder Bay, Ontario.
- 1983 Contemporary Indian and Inuit Art of Canada organised by the Bureau of Indian Affairs and Development, for UN-Headquarters, New York.

=== Individual exhibitions ===
- 1974 Evans Gallery, Toronto, Ontario
- 1975 Evans Gallery, Toronto, Ontario
- 1978 "bingo," Wells Gallery, Ottawa, Ontario
- 1978 Guild of Craft, Montreal, Quebec
- 1979 Guild of Craft, Montreal, Quebec
- 1980 "Wind, Rain and Snow," Ells Gallery, Ottawa, Ontario
- 1983 "Last Snows in Spring," Nishnawbe Arts, Toronto, Ontario
- 1984 "Renegade," Thunder Bay National Exhibition Center and Center for Indian Art, Thunder Bay, Ontario
- 1986 Galerie Francis Alexandre, Ottawa, Ontario
- 1988 Galerie Francis Alexandre, Ottawa, Ontario
- 2017-2018 (October 2017, 4th - February 2018, 25th) "Nordamerika Native Museum", Zurich: "Geschichten aus dem Waldland".

=== Public commissions ===
- Sketches for Olympic Medal series IV, 1976
- Memorial for Ron Shackleton, University of Western Ontario, London, Ontario.

== Books ==
=== Author and illustrator ===
- 1993:Last Leaf, First Snowflake to Fall, Douglas & McIntyre Orchard Books NY
- 1995:A Fish Tale, Or, The Little One That Got Away], Douglas & McIntyre
- 2006:Ancient Thunder Groundwood Books

=== Illustrator ===
- 1969:Peter Desbarats, What They Used To Tell About, Indian Legends from Labrador, McClelland and Stewart
- 1994:Armand Garnet Ruffo, Opening in the Sky, Theytus Press
- 2001:Tomson Highway, Johnny National, Super Hero, Health Canada (Ottawa, Ontario, Canada),
- 2002:Al Hunter, Spirit Horses Kegedonce Press
- 2014:Joanne Arnott, Halfling Spring: an internet romance Kegedonce Press

== Awards ==
- Governor General's Literary Award, Children's literature (illustration) 2006
- Amelia Frances Howard-Gibbon Illustrator's Award 1994
- Elizabeth Mrazik-Cleaver Canadian Picture Book Award 1994
- Mr. Christie's Book Award 1993
- Governor General's Literary Award, Children's Literature, nominee 1993

== See also ==
- List of writers from peoples indigenous to the Americas
- Royal Canadian Mint Olympic Coins
- Governor General's Award for English-language children's illustration
- List of Canadian poets
