= Shelagh Armstrong =

Canadian illustrator (born 1961)

- Born: 1961 (age 64–65); Owen Sound, Ontario, Canada
- Known for: illustrator

Shelagh Armstrong (born 1961) is a Canadian illustrator, and was the recipient of the 1985 Will Davies award for excellence in illustration.

== Life and career ==
Born in Owen Sound, Ontario, Armstrong is a graduate of the University of Toronto and Ontario College of Art. She holds degrees in Fine Arts and Communications and Design. In 2023, Shelagh received a M.A. in Illustration with distinction from Falmouth University in the U.K.

Launching her illustration career in the Canadian book industry, and working with publishing houses such as McClelland and Steward and McGraw-Hill, Armstrong’s diverse artistic accomplishments also include book cover illustration for acclaimed authors as Alberto Manguel, Dionne Brand, Lillian Nattel, and Shauna Singh Baldwin.

Armstrong has worked as a courtroom illustrator, with retail fashion companies, and with top Canadian design firms. During her career, Armstrong has been commissioned for private portraits and exhibits her work in private and university galleries, group and solo exhibits.

She has received commissions from Canada Post for two Canadian stamps - Royal Agricultural Winter Fair and Canada's International Year of the Older Persons. She was also commissioned by the Royal Canadian Mint to create various coins. Her first coin was the 1999 Special Edition Proof Silver Dollar for the International Year of the Older Persons. The coin supported Canada's concept of A Society for All Ages. In 2010, she created a coin for the XXI Olympic Winter Games held in Vancouver. She created a design named Athletes' Pride, struck on both a 2007 $25 Sterling Silver Hologram Coin and a 2007 $75 Gold Coloured Coin.

Armstrong currently resides in Toronto with husband, graphic designer Paul Hodgson and has a son named Caden who was born in April 2000.

== Commercial portfolio ==
- Bicks Relish Packaging Illustration
- Body Shop Christmas Packaging Packaging Illustration
- Dairyland Plus Packaging Illustration
- Humber River Regional Hospital Nursing Campaign
- Kleenex Tissue Packaging Packaging Illustration
- Our Compliments Shredded Cheese Packaging Illustration
- Royal Winter Fair & Garden Show Advertising and Stamp Illustrations
- Santa Fe Flat Bread Packaging Illustration
- Sugar Twin Sweeteners Packaging Illustration
- Toronto Hydro Corporation Figure Illustration
- Weston Artisan Style Bread Packaging Illustration

Armstrong provided the art for a book written by David J. Smith titled If the World were a village: A book about the World's People (ISBN 1550747797). The book was published in February, 2002 by Kids Can Press. This was Smith's first children's book. It went into paperback in 2003 and won various awards including:

- Premio H.C.Andersen Award in 2003 for the Italian Edition.
- International Reading Association Children's Book Award 2003
- IRA and Children's Book Council Children's Choice Book for 2003
- International Reading Association Teachers' Choice Book
- National Parenting Publications Awards—Gold Award Winner 2003
- Smithsonian Magazine "Notable Book of the Year"

== Coin designs ==
Armstrong's first coin for the Royal Canadian Mint was in 1999. The artwork that she produced in 2007 was used for two Canadian Olympic coins.

Year of Issue	Design	Mintage	Issue price	Release date	Composition	Finish	Weight (grams)	Diameter (mm)
1999	International Year of Older Persons	24,976	$49.95	N/A	92.5% silver, 7.5% copper	Proof	25.175	36.07
2007	Athletes Pride (Silver)	45,000	$69.95	July 11	92.5% silver, 7.5% copper	Proof (with hologram on reverse)	27.78	40
2007	Athletes Pride (14K Gold)	8,000	$389.95	July 11	58.33% gold, 41.67% silver	Proof (with colour on reverse)	12	27

== Stamp designs ==
Armstrong has created two stamps for Canada Post. The first stamp was to commemorate the 75th anniversary of Toronto's Royal Agricultural Winter Fair, while her second stamp was for the United Nations' International Year of Older Persons.

=== Royal Winter Fair ===
In 1997, Canada Post celebrated the 75th anniversary of Toronto's Royal Agricultural Winter Fair - the world's largest indoor equestrian and agricultural competition - with a single, domestic-rate commemorative stamp.

Designed by Heather Lafleur of Gottschalk + Ash International with illustration by Shelagh Armstrong, the stamp features an array of livestock, produce, home-made goods and other farm-related wares presented against the backdrop of a packed arena at the Royal Horse Show, Canada's premier international indoor equestrian event.

Date of Issue	Theme	Denomination	Printer	Quantity	Perforation
6 November 1997	Royal Agricultural Winter Fair, Toronto, 75 Years	45 cents	Canadian Bank Note Company, Limited	8,000,000	12.5 x 13

=== International Year of Older Persons ===
The United Nations, of which Canada is one of the original member-states, has declared 1999 to be the "International Year of Older Persons" (IYOP).

With these transformations in mind, the UN chose "towards a society for All Ages" to serve as the theme for IYOP. Throughout the year, participating countries will foster awareness of seniors' roles in society and the need for intergenerational respect and support, emphasizing the fact that older persons are the repository of their societies' histories.

The stamp, designed by Paul Hodgson and Spencer Francey Peters, with illustration by Shelagh Armstrong, shows a metaphorical illustration of an older couple enjoying active experiences as they progress down the Road of Life. The trees that line this path symbolize the concept of passing time and aging, as young spring trees in the foreground give way to summer bloom and then autumn foliage on the horizon. The people are purposefully ambiguous to represent all humans and ethnic groups.

Date of Issue	Theme	Denomination	Printer	Quantity	Perforation
12 April 1999	Canada's International Year of Older Persons	46 cents	Canadian Bank Note Company, Limited	8,000,000	13.5

== See also ==
- Royal Canadian Mint Olympic Coins
