= Summer Olympic Coins (2000–present) =

Traditionally, Olympic coins are numismatic coins. However, several host countries minted so many coins – particularly silver ones – that their value has become just slightly above the value of their metal content. Coins for the 1976 Montreal, 1984 Los Angeles, and 1988 Seoul are generally considered to fall into that category.

There have been cases, though, in which host countries minted circulating commemorative coins. For example, Canada's Lucky Loonie program and its 2007 25-cent pieces to commemorate the 2010 Vancouver Olympic Games, and Brazil's 1-real pieces that commemorate the 2014 Rio de Janeiro Olympic Games.

== Summer Games ==
Year	Event	Number of Coins
1896	1896 Summer Olympics, Athens, Greece	None
1900	1900 Summer Olympics, Paris, France	None
1904	1904 Summer Olympics, St. Louis, USA	None
1908	1908 Summer Olympics, London, England	None
1912	1912 Summer Olympics, Stockholm, Sweden	None
1920	1920 Summer Olympics, Antwerp, Belgium	None
1924	1924 Summer Olympics, Paris, France	None
1928	1928 Summer Olympics, Amsterdam, Netherlands	None
1932	1932 Summer Olympics, Los Angeles, USA	None
1936	1936 Summer Olympics, Berlin, Germany	None
1948	1948 Summer Olympics, London, England	None
1952	1952 Summer Olympics, Helsinki, Finland	1
1956	1956 Summer Olympics, Melbourne, Australia and Stockholm, Sweden	None
1960	1960 Summer Olympics, Rome, Italy	None
1964	1964 Summer Olympics, Tokyo, Japan	2
1968	1968 Summer Olympics, Mexico City, Mexico	1
1972	1972 Summer Olympics, Munich, Germany	6
1976	1976 Summer Olympics, Montreal, Canada	30
1980	Summer Olympics, Moscow, Russia	45
1984	1984 Summer Olympics, Los Angeles, USA	6
1988	1988 Summer Olympics, Seoul, Korea	32
1992	1992 Summer Olympics, Barcelona, Spain	30
1996	1996 Summer Olympics, Atlanta, USA	16
2000	2000 Summer Olympics, Sydney, Australia	59
2004	2004 Summer Olympics, Athens, Greece	1
2008	2008 Summer Olympics, Beijing, China	27
2012	2012 Summer Olympics, London, United Kingdom	33
2016	2016 Summer Olympics, Rio de Janeiro, Brazil	36
2020	2020 Summer Olympics, Tokyo, Japan	39
2024	2024 Summer Olympics, Paris, France	

== 2000 Sydney Olympics ==
This set has been popular with collectors, with people still trying to get hold of a complete set. The first coin in this set was sold out at the quickly and it has left many people with incomplete sets.

=== Olympic Gold Proof Coin Collection ===
- The eight gold coins of the collection depict the athlete's journey from the inspiration of the Games logo, through dedication to the task, preparation for the event and final achievement. The coins have been released progressively from October 1997 to February 2000. The worldwide mintage of gold coins is limited to only 30,000 per design.
- All the gold coins carry the 'P' mintmark of The Perth Mint and bear the year 2000, making them the first coins of the year 2000. Colour is used on selected gold coin designs - another first for Australian and official Olympic Games coins. Each coin is accompanied by a serial-numbered certificate of authenticity and is presented in a green presentation case.

Denomination	Metal	Mass	Diameter	Mint Mark	Mintage
A $100	24 kt Gold	10.00 grams	25.00 mm	P for Perth Mint	30,000 per design

Year	Theme	Reverse Design	Border of the Coin
1997	Journey Begins	Depicts the determination to train in defiance of the elements	A border of Olympic flames surrounds the logo.
N/A	Dedication I	Official logo of the Sydney 2000 Olympic Games in colour	The border of the coin represents a heart monitor, taking its measure of the athlete's exertions.
N/A	Dedication II	The third gold coin in the series symbolises the athlete's dedication to attaining peak fitness in the quest for Olympic glory. The pain and effort of a gruelling weights session in the gymnasium are symbolised in the image, which represents the common experience of athletes across a range of Olympic sports. Athletes of various nationalities, both male and female, are personified in the design.	The border comprises items of equipment used in training for many Olympic sports, from a loud-hailer used in rowing training, to boxing gloves, a hockey stick and a tennis racquet.
N/A	Preparation I	Depicts a veteran athletics coach demonstrating shot put technique to aspiring young athletes.	Dramatic shades of blue around the border evoke the cold mountainous regions of the world, from which some of the Olympic athletes will come. The ring of mountains links fifteen of the official pictograms, which depict the sports of the Sydney 2000 Olympic Games.
N/A	Preparation II	The central image on the reverse design depicts an athlete and coach working on one of the most crucial aspects of a sprint race - the start.	The border comprises 15 of the 34 official pictograms representing the sports and disciplines of the Sydney 2000 Olympic Games. The colour green in the border represents the cultivated and tropical areas from which some of the Olympic competitors will come.
N/A	Achievement (Stadium)	The central image on the reverse design depicts the Olympic Stadium, the largest outdoor venue in Olympic history. It is the centrepiece of Sydney Olympic Park, and will be the venue for the opening and closing ceremonies.	The coins red border comprises 15 of the 34 official pictograms representing the sports and disciplines of the Sydney 2000 Olympic Games. The red colour represents the rugged regions from which many Australian athletes come.
N/A	Achievement (Athlete)	The presentation of the ultimate athletic prize - an Olympic gold medal - is the central image on the reverse design.	The coin's yellow border comprises 15 of the 34 official pictograms representing the sports and disciplines of the Sydney 2000 Olympic Games. The shades of yellow represent the arid and desert areas from which many of the world's greatest athletes now come.
N/A	Achievement (Torch)	The central image of the coin is the Sydney 2000 Olympic torch, which draws its inspiration from the Sydney Opera House, the blue waters of the Pacific Ocean and the curve of the boomerang.	The border shows 25 athletes carrying the Olympic flame.

=== $5 Silver Proof Coin Collection ===
- The silver coins depict the wider role of the Sydney 2000 Olympic Games as a symbol of peace and cultural harmony, and the uniqueness of Australia's environment. The Sydney 2000 Olympic Silver Coin Collection consists of 16 proof quality coins that have been released two at a time between October 1997 and February 2000.
- One coin in each release reflects the coming together of peoples and ideas in our culturally diverse nation, as expressed in the four great festivals being celebrated in Sydney leading up to the Olympic Games. The other coin highlights the environmental richness of the Australian continent. Each coin bears the mintmark of the Mint producing the coin.
- The 2000 Olympic Silver set comprises sixteen coins struck in 99.9% pure silver. These coins were designed to represent both Australia's cultural history and environment. The silver set is available in the complete set of sixteen coins, or individually.

==== Specifications ====
Denomination	Composition	Weight	Diameter	Mintage
A $5	Silver (99.9%)	31.635 grams	40.50 mm	100,000

==== Coin Details ====
Artist	Reverse Design	Border
Nova Peris-Kneebone, and Stuart Devlin	The figures in the centre of the design depict two people. The circle around them represents their dreams, the smaller dots their family and friends. The waves symbolise the obstacles they must overcome, while the stars symbolise the notion that the sky is the limit to accomplishment if dreams are backed by dedication.	A variety of Australian sea-life - reef fish, stingrays, crocodiles, sea snakes and turtles - make up the elaborate border, together with the Millennium Athlete of the Sydney 2000 Olympic Games logo.
N/A	The Kangaroos are surrounded by native Xanthorrhoea plants, commonly known as Grasstrees, or by their Aboriginal name - 'Balga' trees.	The perimeter of the coin features the inscription: "Commemorating the Olympic Games of the new Millennium in Sydney in the Year 2000 AD. Celebrating the unique animals, birds, fish and flora of Australia and the spirit of the Games of the XXVII Olympiad."
N/A	The theme of reconciliation and co-operation is symbolised representing the story of the discovery and settlement of Australia. Sailing ships, which transported the European explorers and colonists, surround the 'Mother Country'.	Two human figures and footprints represent Australia's indigenous and non-indigenous population, standing together as one - a symbol of reconciliation and harmony.
N/A	The Great White Shark is the focal point of this design.	The sharks are surrounded by a border of coral and seaweed found in Australian waters.
N/A	This design focuses on Australia's evolution as a multicultural society. The image depicts a central, wise Aboriginal elder, surrounded by Australians of diverse ethnic backgrounds symbolising both the starting point and development of Australian society.	The border comprises the ships and aircraft that brought to Australia the immigrants who shaped and enriched the nation's culture and way of life.
N/A	The third silver coin in the 'environmental' series features two of Australia's most famous natural treasures - the Frill-necked lizard, in typical aggressive pose.	An elaborate border of the flowers, buds and foliage of Sturt's Desert Pea, both found in Australia's tropical north.
N/A	'Reaching the World I' celebrates Australian achievements in commerce, industry and technology. The design incorporates the commercial districts of Melbourne, the distinctive towers and chimneys of a large industrial power station	Satellite dishes that link Australia to the world through latest communications technology
N/A	'Emu and Wattle' features two of Australia's most famous flora and fauna. Two adult emus caring for two chicks and a clutch of unhatched eggs are the focus of the design. The emu also features on the Australian Coat of Arms, and is the second tallest of the world's flightless birds, reaching two metres in height.	A border of Australia's national flower, the wattle, frames the group.
Stuart Devlin	Figures representing ballet, painting, opera, pop music, athletics, golf and soccer radiate out from a map of Australia. They are framed by a border of famous international arts and sports venues at which Australians have performed or had their work shocased.	The venues are interspersed with cityscapes from around the world. The venues are (clockwise from bottom left) the Royal Albert Hall, London, the Olympic Sports Halls, Tokyo, the Guggenheim Museum, New York, Wembley Stadium, London, the Metropolitan Opera House, New York and the Palezetto dello Sport, Rome.
Stuart Devlin	The Sydney Harbour Bridge, one of Australia's most famous landmarks, is depicted on the reverse.	The border design is based on one of Australia's most beautiful trees, the Red Flowering Gum.
Stuart Devlin	One of Australia's most endearing ambassadors, the koala, is the central feature of the reverse design.	The border design shows the myriad of vessels - ferries, yachts, cruiseliners and pleasurecraft - that traverse Sydney harbour daily.
Stuart Devlin	The platypus, one of Australia's unique creatures, is the central feature of the reverse. The platypus is the inspiration for Syd, one of the three Olympic Games Mascots.	A border of Australian water lilies surrounds the design. With violet flowers and broad flat leaves, these plants create a spectacular sight in tropical Australian wetlands.
Stuart Devlin	The platypus, one of Australia's most unusual creatures, is the central feature of the reverse. The platypus is the inspiration for Syd, one of the three Olympic Games Mascots.	A border of Australian water lilies surrounds the design. With violet flowers and broad flat leaves, these plants create a spectacular sight in tropical Australian wetlands.
Stuart Devlin	The Sydney Opera House.	The central image is surrounded by a border of historic and modern Sydney city buildings including the AMP Tower, the Sydney Observatory, the Chinese Garden Pagoda, Horby Lighthouse and the Sydney Convention Centre.
N/A	The echidna, which features on the reverse of this coin, is one of Australia's most interesting native animals. It is the inspiration for Millie, one of the three Sydney 2000 Olympic Games Mascots.	A border of tea tree flowers and leaves surrounds the echidna design. The tea tree is a small paperbark tree with narrow leaves and five-petal flowers. Some species contain an essential oil that is recognised internationally for its antiseptic properties.
N/A	The coin depicts Sydney Harbour, looking towards the entrance of the harbour, or 'Heads', from the city. It shows the sea and the land, dominated by the air above. Fort Denison is depicted in the middle of the harbour.	The border of the coin shows the diverse weather conditions experienced throughout this vast country. Rain, wind, sun, snow, clouds and clear skies are all represented.
Stuart Devlin	The Kookaburra features as the central image of the reverse. The Kookaburra is the inspiration for Olly, one of three Sydney Olympic Games Mascots.	A border of the flowers and leaves of the waratah, one of Australia's most spectacular native plants. It has crimson flowers with leathery spiked leaves and is the floral emblem of New South Wales.

=== Olympic Kilogram Coin ===
At the time, the 1 Kilo Proof coin was the largest Olympic coin released. All 28 sports were depicted on this pure silver (.999%) coin. It was packaged in a Jarrah box, complete with a serial numbered Certificate of Authenticity. With only 20,000 minted, it was a very popular coin.

=== $5 Bronze Collection ===
This release for the Sydney 2000 Bronze Olympic coins has 28 coins in the complete set. Each individual coin displays one of the 28 sports which were played at the games. The coins were sold individually or in a complete set.

Description
Athletics
Aquatics
Modern Pentathlon
Canoe/Kayak
Field Hockey
Basketball
Judo
Triathlon
Archery
Rowing
Boxing
Handball
Gymnastics
Badminton
Fencing
Softball
Sailing
Volleyball
Taekwondo
Football (Soccer)
Weightlifting
Equestrian
Table Tennis
Wrestling
Cycling
Shooting
Baseball
Tennis

=== Olymphilex Uncirculated Dollar ===
The Royal Australian Mint released this coin in commemoration of the Olymphilex exhibition held in Sydney whilst the 2000 Olympic Games were on. The Coin has edged lettering with the word Sydney displayed on it. The coin is available with Canberra and Sydney edged on the coin.

=== Paralympic Games Victory Silver Dollar Coin ===
This Sydney 2000 Paralympic Commemorative coin released by the Royal Australian Mint depicts the medals which were awarded to the winning Paralympians. The coin displays the Paralympic logo and is struck strictly to demand from orders placed before the closing of the Paralympic games. These releases were the IOC's first Victory Medals on legal tender.

=== Paralympic Games Victory 10oz Silver Proof Coin ===
The 10oz coin symbolizes Paralympic remembrance, featuring the design of the Sydney Harbour Bridge and the Opera House as its centrepiece. This coin is struck from 99.9% fine silver in proof quality and is presented in a teak timber case together with a certificate of authenticity. The coin had a mintage of 3,000.

=== Paralympic Games Gold, Silver and Bronze Coins ===
Gold, Silver and Bronze coins were released to commemorate the Sydney 2000 Paralympic Games. The Silver and Bronze coins are legal tender and have a face value of $5.

== 2004 Athens Olympics ==
- 2 Euro base metal circulating coin
- 10 Euro Silver
- 100 Euro Gold
- 12 Coin Silver Set
- 6 Coin Gold Set
- 6 Coin Set (4 Silver, 2 Gold)

Image	Country	Feature	Volume	Date
width=160 |	Greece	Summer Olympics in Athens 2004	50 million coins	14 March 2004
Description: The Discobolus (a classical Greek sculpture by Myron) is depicted in the centre of the coin. To the right of it is the logo of the Olympic games (ATHENS 2004) and the five Olympic Rings, while to the left the denomination of the coin in Greek is given (2 ΕΥΡΩ). The twelve stars of the European Union surround the design. The year mark is split around the star in the bottom centre (20*04), and the mint mark is to the upper right of the statue's head.

== 2008 Beijing Olympics ==
=== 1 Yuan ===
Year	Denomination	Alloy	Reverse	Diameter	Weight	Obverse	Mintage	Series
2007	1 Yuan	Brass	Weightlifting	25 mm	6.75 gr	Emblem of the XXIX Olympiad, and the year 2008.	10,000,000	I series
2007	1 Yuan	Brass	Swimming	25 mm	6.75 gr	Emblem of the XXIX Olympiad, and the year 2008.	10,000,000	I series
2008	1 Yuan	Brass	Archery	25 mm	6.75 gr	Emblem of the XXIX Olympiad, and the year 2008.	10,000,000	II series
2008	1 Yuan	Brass	Gymnastics	25 mm	6.75 gr	Emblem of the XXIX Olympiad, and the year 2008.	10,000,000	II series
2008	1 Yuan	Brass	Table tennis	25 mm	6.75 gr	Emblem of the XXIX Olympiad, and the year 2008.	10,000,000	II series
2008	1 Yuan	Brass	Fencing	25 mm	6.75 gr	Emblem of the XXIX Olympiad, and the year 2008.	10,000,000	III series
2008	1 Yuan	Brass	Football	25 mm	6.75 gr	Emblem of the XXIX Olympiad, and the year 2008.	10,000,000	III series
2008	1 Yuan	Brass	Modern pentathlon	25 mm	6.75 gr	Emblem of the XXIX Olympiad, and the year 2008.	10,000,000	III series

=== 10 Yuan ===
Year	Denomination	Reverse	Weight	Diameter	Fineness	Obverse	Series
2006	10 Yuan	Kite Flying	1 Troy Ounce	40 mm	.999 Silver	Emblem of the XXIX Olympiad, traditional paired Chinese dragon, name of People's Republic of China and the year 2008.	I series
2006	10 Yuan	Goat Jumping	1 Troy Ounce	40 mm	.999 Silver	Emblem of the XXIX Olympiad, traditional paired Chinese dragon, name of People's Republic of China and the year 2008.	I series
2006	10 Yuan	Hoop Rolling	1 Troy Ounce	40 mm	.999 Silver	Emblem of the XXIX Olympiad, traditional paired Chinese dragon, name of People's Republic of China and the year 2008.	I series
2006	10 Yuan	Shuttlecock Kicking	1 Troy Ounce	40 mm	.999 Silver	Emblem of the XXIX Olympiad, traditional paired Chinese dragon, name of People's Republic of China and the year 2008.	I series
2007	10 Yuan	Traditional Courtyard Residence in Beijing	1 Troy Ounce	40 mm	.999 Silver	Emblem of the XXIX Olympiad, traditional paired Chinese dragon, name of People's Republic of China and the year 2008.	II series
2007	10 Yuan	Summer Palace	1 Troy Ounce	40 mm	.999 Silver	Emblem of the XXIX Olympiad, traditional paired Chinese dragon, name of People's Republic of China and the year 2008.	II series
2007	10 Yuan	Great Wall of China	1 Troy Ounce	40 mm	.999 Silver	Emblem of the XXIX Olympiad, traditional paired Chinese dragon, name of People's Republic of China and the year 2008.	II series
2007	10 Yuan	Tibetan Tower of Beihai Park in Beijing	1 Troy Ounce	40 mm	.999 Silver	Emblem of the XXIX Olympiad, traditional paired Chinese dragon, name of People's Republic of China and the year 2008.	II series
2008	10 Yuan	Traditional Chinese Peking Opera (with selectively colored mask at the right side)	1 Troy Ounce	40 mm	.999 Silver	Emblem of the XXIX Olympiad, traditional paired Chinese dragon, name of People's Republic of China and the year 2008.	III series
2008	10 Yuan	Yangge Dance (colorized image on the right)	1 Troy Ounce	40 mm	.999 Silver	Emblem of the XXIX Olympiad, traditional paired Chinese dragon, name of People's Republic of China and the year 2008.	III series
2008	10 Yuan	Chinese Lion Dance (folk art of Shadowgraph on the right)	1 Troy Ounce	40 mm	.999 Silver	Emblem of the XXIX Olympiad, traditional paired Chinese dragon, name of People's Republic of China and the year 2008.	III series
2008	10 Yuan	Beijing Tea Stall (image from the Spring Festival at the right)	1 Troy Ounce	40 mm	.999 Silver	Emblem of the XXIX Olympiad, traditional paired Chinese dragon, name of People's Republic of China and the year 2008.	III series

=== 150 Yuan ===
Year	Denomination	Reverse	Weight	Diameter	Fineness	Obverse	Series
2006	150 Yuan	Equestrian	.33 Troy Ounce	23 mm	.9999 Gold	Emblem of the XXIX Olympiad, traditional paired Chinese dragon, name of People's Republic of China and the year 2008.	I series
2006	150 Yuan	Archery	.33 Troy Ounce	23 mm	.9999 Gold	Emblem of the XXIX Olympiad, traditional paired Chinese dragon, name of People's Republic of China and the year 2008.	I series
2007	150 Yuan	Weightlifting	.33 Troy Ounce	23 mm	.9999 Gold	Emblem of the XXIX Olympiad, traditional paired Chinese dragon, name of People's Republic of China and the year 2008.	II series
2007	150 Yuan	Swimming	.33 Troy Ounce	23 mm	.9999 Gold	Emblem of the XXIX Olympiad, traditional paired Chinese dragon, name of People's Republic of China and the year 2008.	II series
2008	150 Yuan	Chinese Cuju Sport	.33 Troy Ounce	23 mm	.9999 Gold	Emblem of the XXIX Olympiad, traditional paired Chinese dragon, name of People's Republic of China and the year 2008.	III series
2008	150 Yuan	Wrestling	.33 Troy Ounce	23 mm	.9999 Gold	Emblem of the XXIX Olympiad, traditional paired Chinese dragon, name of People's Republic of China and the year 2008.	III series

=== 300 Yuan ===
Year	Denomination	Reverse	Weight	Diameter	Fineness	Obverse	Series	Mintage
2007	300 Yuan	Dragon boat racing	1 kilogram	100 mm	.999 silver	Emblem of the XXIX Olympiad in color, name of People's Republic of China and the year 2008.	II series	20,008
2008	300 Yuan	Tug of war	1 kilogram	100 mm	.999 silver	Emblem of the XXIX Olympiad in color, name of People's Republic of China and the year 2008.	III series	20,008

=== 2,000 Yuan ===
Year	Denomination	Reverse	Weight	Diameter	Fineness	Obverse	Series	Mintage
2007	2,000 Yuan	Martial Art	5 Troy Ounce	60 mm	.999 Gold	Emblem of the XXIX Olympiad in color, name of People's Republic of China and the year 2008.	II series	2,008
2008	2,000 Yuan	Modern Sports	5 Troy Ounce	60 mm	.999 Gold	Emblem of the XXIX Olympiad in color, name of People's Republic of China and the year 2008.	II series	2,008

=== 100,000 Yuan ===
Year	Denomination	Reverse	Weight	Diameter	Fineness	Obverse	Mintage
2008	100,000 Yuan	Hall of Prayer for Good Harvests with a group of athletes engaged in numerous sports	10 kilograms	18 cm	.999 Gold	Emblem of the XXIX Olympiad in color, name of People's Republic of China and the year 2008.	29

=== 2007 ===
- Four Proof 1-ounce .999 silver 10-yuan coins (to be determined)
- Two Proof third-ounce .9999 fine gold 150-yuan coins (to be determined)
- Five ounce Gold Coin
- One kilogram Silver Coin
- Two circulation coins (to be determined)

=== 2008 ===
- Five ounce Gold Coin
- One kilogram Silver Coin
- Two circulation coins (to be determined)

== 2012 London Olympics ==
Image	Value	Details
	50 pence	Release year: 2012 Occasion: London 2012 Summer Olympics; Sport depicted: Rowing
	50 pence	Release year: 2011 Occasion: London 2012 Summer Olympics; Sport depicted: Archery
	50 pence	Release year: 2011 Occasion: London 2012 Summer Olympics; Sport depicted: Shooting sport
	50 pence	Release year: 2012 Occasion: United Kingdom circulation during the Olympic year Sport depicted: Swimming

=== Olympic Games Handover Ceremony - £2 ===
Image	Value	Details
	£2	Release year: 2010 Occasion: Olympic Games handover ceremony, marking the transition from Beijing 2008 to London 2012; Design: The Olympic flag

== 2016 Rio de Janeiro Olympics ==
The Central Bank of Brazil has released a few commemorative coins celebrating the 2016 Summer Olympics. To commemorate the handover of the Olympic flag, a R$1 coin was released in 2012.

Throughout 2016, sixteen different R$1 coin designs were released, representing a variety of sports practiced during the Olympics.

Additionally, non-circulating coins with non-standard values (namely, R$5 and R$10) were also released as proof mintings.

Brazilian real coins commemorating the Olympics
Image	Value	Details
	1 real	Release date: 13 August 2012; Occasion: The Olympic Flag Handover for the Rio 2016 Summer Olympics; Units produced: 2 million Reverse: The Olympic Flag in a pole above the official logo of the Games of the XXXI Olympiad. In the outer ring, the inscriptions "Entrega da Bandeira Olímpica" (Olympic Flag Handover) and "Londres 2012—Rio 2016" (London 2012—Rio 2016)
	1 real	Release dates: 28 November 2014, 17 April 2015, 7 August 2015, 19 February 2016 (four sets of four designs); Occasion: 2016 Summer Olympics; Units produced: 20 million for each design Reverse: Sixteen coin designs, representing athletics (triple jump), swimming, paralympic triathlon, golf, basketball, sailing, paralympic canoeing, rugby, football, volleyball, paralympic athletics (running), judo, boxing, paralympic swimming, and each mascot of the 2016 Summer Olympics and Paralympics.
(missing photo)	5 reais	Release date: 13 August 2012; Occasion: The Olympic Flag Handover for the Rio 2016 Summer Olympics; Units produced: 14.127
(missing photo)	10 reais	Release date: 28 November 2014 (100 metres); 17 April 2015 (pole vault); 7 August 2015 (freestyle wrestling); 19 February 2016 (Olympic torch); Occasion: Commemorating the 2016 Summer Olympics, which took place in Rio de Janeiro; Units produced: 5 thousand (each)
(missing photo)	5 reais	Release date: 28 November 2014; 17 April 2015; 7 August 2015; 19 February 2016; Occasion: Commemorating the 2016 Summer Olympics, which took place in Rio de Janeiro; Units produced (4 versions): 18.700 + 17.500 + 18 thousand + 13.850 (rowing); 18.700 + 17.500 + 17 thousand + 13.900 (cycling); 18.700 + 17.500 + 17 thousand + 13.300 (athletics); 18.700 + 17.500 + 17.759 + 13.750 (beach volleyball)

== 2020 Tokyo Olympics ==
=== 100 Yen ===
Year	Photo	Denomination	Alloy	Reverse	Diameter	Weight	Obverse	Mintage	Series
2018		100 yen	Copper-nickel clad copper	Karate	22.6 mm	4.8 g	Games of the XXXII Olympiad	3,948,000	
2018		100 yen	Copper-nickel clad copper	Skateboarding	22.6 mm	4.8 g	Games of the XXXII Olympiad	3,948,000	
2019		100 yen	Copper-nickel clad copper	Sport Climbing	22.6 mm	4.8 g	Games of the XXXII Olympiad	3,948,000	
2019		100 yen	Copper-nickel clad copper	Surfing	22.6 mm	4.8 g	Games of the XXXII Olympiad	3,948,000	
2019–2020		100 yen	Copper-nickel clad copper	Archery	22.6 mm	4.8 g	Games of the XXXII Olympiad	3,948,000	
2019–2020		100 yen	Copper-nickel clad copper	Canoeing	22.6 mm	4.8 g	Games of the XXXII Olympiad	3,948,000	
2019–2020		100 yen	Copper-nickel clad copper	Cycling	22.6 mm	4.8 g	Games of the XXXII Olympiad	3,948,000	
2019		100 yen	Copper-nickel clad copper	Goalball	22.6 mm	4.8 g	Games of the XXXII Olympiad	3,948,000	
2019		100 yen	Copper-nickel clad copper	Weightlifting	22.6 mm	4.8 g	Games of the XXXII Olympiad	3,948,000	
2019		100 yen	Copper-nickel clad copper	Football	22.6 mm	4.8 g	Games of the XXXII Olympiad	3,948,000	
2020		100 yen	Copper-nickel clad copper	Miraitowa	22.6 mm	4.8 g	Games of the XXXII Olympiad	3,948,000	
2020		100 yen	Copper-nickel clad copper	Tennis	22.6 mm	4.8 g	Games of the XXXII Olympiad	3,948,000	
2020		100 yen	Copper-nickel clad copper	Volleyball	22.6 mm	4.8 g	Games of the XXXII Olympiad	3,948,000	

=== 500 Yen ===
Year	Photo	Denomination	Alloy	Reverse	Diameter	Weight	Obverse	Mintage	Series
2020		500 yen	Bi-metallic (copper-nickel plated copper center in nickel-brass ring)	Thunder God	26.5 mm	7.1 g	Games of the XXXII Olympiad	4,000,000	

=== 1,000 Yen ===
Year	Photo	Denomination	Alloy	Reverse	Diameter	Weight	Obverse	Mintage	Series
2018		1,000 yen	.999 Silver	Swimming	40 mm	31.1 g	Games of the XXXII Olympiad	100,000	
2018		1,000 yen	.999 Silver	Athletics	40 mm	31.1 g	Games of the XXXII Olympiad	100,000	
2018		1,000 yen	.999 Silver	Badminton	40 mm	31.1 g	Games of the XXXII Olympiad	100,000	
2018		1,000 yen	.999 Silver	Baseball and Softball	40 mm	31.1 g	Games of the XXXII Olympiad	100,000	
2019–2020		1,000 yen	.999 Silver	Athletics	40 mm	31.1 g	Games of the XXXII Olympiad	100,000	
2019–2020		1,000 yen	.999 Silver	Judo	40 mm	31.1 g	Games of the XXXII Olympiad	100,000	
2019–2020		1,000 yen	.999 Silver	Table tennis	40 mm	31.1 g	Games of the XXXII Olympiad	100,000	
2020		1,000 yen	.999 Silver	Boxing	40 mm	31.1 g	Games of the XXXII Olympiad	100,000	
2020		1,000 yen	.999 Silver	Wrestling	40 mm	31.1 g	Games of the XXXII Olympiad	100,000	

=== 10,000 Yen ===
Year	Photo	Denomination	Alloy	Reverse	Diameter	Weight	Obverse	Mintage	Series
2018		10,000 yen	.999 Gold	Horseback archery	26 mm	15.6 g	Games of the XXXII Olympiad	40,000	
2019–2020		10,000 yen	.999 Gold	Victory and Glory	26 mm	15.6 g	Games of the XXXII Olympiad	40,000	

== 2024 Paris Olympics ==
Year	Photo	Denomination	Alloy	Reverse	Diameter	Weight	Obverse	Mintage	Series
2024		2 euro	.999 Gold	The Eiffel Tower in Paris, the Basilica of Notre-Dame-de-la-Garde in Marseille and the Tiaré flower in Tahiti	26 mm	15.6 g	Games of the XXXII Olympiad	40,000	
2024		2 euro	.999 Gold	Arc de Triomphe and a winged discus thrower	26 mm	15.6 g	Games of the XXXII Olympiad	40,000	

== Euro coins ==
Several countries in the eurozone minted high value euro collectors' coin celebrating this occasion, like the 2008 Olympic Games commemorative coin, minted in June 2008. The obverse carries on the right side a symbol of the Belgian Olympic Committee, in the center an analog of the Olympic flambeau, which constantly burned during the Olympic Games, and on the left side symbols of the Olympic disciplines: cycling, hockey, athletics and tennis can be seen.
