= Summer Olympic coins =

The first Olympic coin can be traced back to 480 BC. The modern Olympics did not see its first commemoratives until 1951. The original concept of Olympic coins was that the Greeks believed that coins brought the general public closer to the Olympic games. The premise was that those who could not attend the games could at least have a tangible souvenir of the event.

In 1951 the government of Finland authorized the striking of the first modern Olympic coin, a 500 Markkaa. At first the coins circulated as currency in the issuing country and the mintages were high. The coins were a memento of the 1951 Games, and a coin that numismatists could collect. With the exception of Canada's Lucky Loonie program and its 2007 25-cent pieces to commemorate the 2010 Vancouver Olympic Games, it is rare that Olympic coins are minted for circulation. Traditionally, Olympic coins are numismatic coins.

== Summer Games ==
Year	Event	Number of Coins
1896	I Olympic Games, Athens, Greece	None
1900	II Olympic Games, Paris, France	None
1904	III Olympic Games, St. Louis, USA	None
1908	IV Olympic Games, London, England	None
1912	V Olympic Games, Stockholm, Sweden	None
1920	VII Olympic Games, Antwerp, Belgium	None
1924	VIII Olympic Games, Paris, France	None
1928	IX Olympic Games, Amsterdam, Netherlands	None
1932	X Olympic Games, Los Angeles, USA	None
1936	XI Olympic Games, Berlin, Germany	None
1948	XIV Olympic Games, London, England	None
1952	XV Olympic Games, Helsinki, Finland	1
1956	XVI Olympic Games, Melbourne, Australia and Stockholm, Sweden	None
1960	XVII Olympic Games, Rome, Italy	None
1964	XVIII Olympic Games, Tokyo, Japan	2
1968	XIX Olympic Games, Mexico City, Mexico	1
1972	XX Olympic Games, Munich, Germany	6
1976	XXI Olympic Games, Montreal, Quebec, Canada	30
1980	XXII Olympic Games, Moscow, Russia	45
1984	XXIII Olympic Games, Los Angeles, USA	6
1988	XXIV Olympic Games, Seoul, Korea	32
1992	XXV Olympic Games, Barcelona, Spain	30
1996	XXVI Olympic Games, Atlanta, USA	16
2000	XXVII Olympic Games, Sydney, Australia	59
2004	XXVIII Olympic Games, Athens, Greece	25
2008	XXIX Olympic Games, Beijing, China	27
2012	XXX Olympic Games, London, England	33
2016	XXXI Olympic Games, Rio de Janeiro, Brazil	36
2020	XXXII Olympic Games, Tokyo, Japan	39
2024	XXXIII Olympic Games, Paris, France	

== 1952 Helsinki Olympics ==
Specifications

Denomination	Reverse Design	Artist	Obverse Design	Artist	Edge	Date of Issue	Finish
500 Markkaa	A wreath surrounding 500 and the legend: "Suomi Finland Markkaa"	A. Altonen and M. Visanti	The Olympic Rings and the legend: “XV Olympia, Helsinki” and the year of 1951 or 1952	A. Altonen and M. Visanti	Symbols of 18 pairs and hands	1951 or 1952	Circulated

Dimensions

Diameter	Weight	Thickness	Composition	Mintage	Mint Mark	Struck by	Issue Price
32 mm	12 grams	2 mm	.500 silver, .400 copper, and .100 nickel	18,500 (1951) and 586,500 (1952)	H (for Director Helle)	Suomen Rahapaja (Finnish Mint)	500 Markkaa (approximately $2.25 US)

== 1964 Tokyo Olympics ==
=== 100 Yen ===
Specifications

Denomination	Reverse Design	Artist	Obverse Design	Artist	Edge	Date of Issue	Finish
100 Yen	The rising sun in the centre, small olive leaves, 100 superimposed, and the legend: “Tokyo 1964” above and below a Japanese legend meaning: “year 39 of the reign of Showa”	Miss Shoko Maejima	The Olympic flame with the Olympic rings and a Japanese legend meaning: “Japan 100 Yen”	Miss Shoko Maejima	Milled	1964	Circulated

Dimensions

Diameter	Weight	Thickness	Composition	Mintage	Mint Mark	Struck by	Issue Price
22.6 mm	4.8 grams	1.7 mm	.600 silver, .300 copper, and .100 zinc	80,000,000	No Mint marks	The Ministry of Finance, Mint Bureau	100 Yen

=== 1000 Yen ===
Specifications

Denomination	Reverse Design	Artist	Obverse Design	Artist	Edge	Date of Issue	Finish
1000 Yen	Cherry blossoms, the Olympic rings, 1 000 yen, the legend: “1964 Tokyo” and a Japanese legend meaning: “year 39 of the reign of Showa”	Mint Officials	Mount Fuji with Cherry Blossoms on each side and a Japanese legend meaning: “Japan 1000 yen”	Mint Officials	Milled	1964	Circulated

Dimensions

Diameter	Weight	Thickness	Composition	Mintage	Mint Mark	Struck by	Issue Price
35 mm	20 grams	2.5 mm	.925 silver and .075 copper	15,000,000	No Mint marks	The Ministry of Finance, Mint Bureau	1000 Yen

== 1968 Mexico City Olympics ==
Specifications

Denomination	Reverse Design	Artist	Obverse Design	Artist	Edge	Date of Issue	Finish
25 pesos	An Aztec ballplayer, the Olympic rings, and the legend: “Juegos de la XIX Olimpiada Mexico 1968”	Lorenzo Rafael	An eagle fighting a snake, the legend: “Estados Unidos Mexicanos”, the words “ley 0.720” and 25 pesos	Ricardo Luna Y Vasco	Incused lettering “Independencia y Libertad”	1968	Circulated

Dimensions

Diameter	Weight	Thickness	Composition	Mintage	Mint Mark	Struck by	Issue Price
38 mm	22.5 grams	2 mm	.720 silver and .280 copper	30,000,000	M (small “o” above the “M”)	La Casa de Moneda de Mexico (Mexican Mint)	25 pesos

== 1972 Munich Olympics ==
During the release of the first four series, a controversy was generated over the legend. The use of the legend, “IN DEUTSCHLAND” was a point of tension for East Germany. The point was raised that the legend should have read “In München”. The legend was changed for Series Five.

=== Series One ===
Specifications

Denomination	Reverse Design	Artist	Obverse Design	Artist	Edge	Date of Issue	Finish
10 Deutsche Mark	A stylized German Eagle, and the legend: “10 Deutsche Mark Bundesrepublik Deutschland”	Greta Lippi-Heinsen, Munich	The 1972 Olympic emblem of Munich, nicknamed “The Wheel of Fortune”, and the legend: “Spiele der XX Olympiade 1972 in Deutschland”	Greta Lippi-Heinsen, Munich	Lettering on a plain edge “Citius Altius Fortius”	1972 (released in January 1970)	Proof and Circulated

Dimensions

Diameter	Weight	Thickness	Composition	Mintage	Mint Mark	Struck by	Issue Price
32.5 mm	15.5 grams	2.25 mm	.625 silver and .375 copper	All mint marks: 125,000 each Proof, 2,375,000 each Circulated	Below the Eagle's right claw: D, F, G, J	Bayer. Hauptmunzamt, Munich (D), Stuttgart (F), Karlsruhe (G), Hamburg (J)	Proof: 15 Deutsche Mark, Circulated: 10 Deutsche Mark

=== Series Two ===
Specifications

Denomination	Reverse Design	Artist	Obverse Design	Artist	Edge	Date of Issue	Finish
10 Deutsche Mark	A stylized German Eagle, and the legend: “Bundesrepublik Deutschland 10 Deutsche Mark”	Reinhart Heinsdorff, Lehen	Intertwining chains on a ribbed disc and the legend: “Olympische Spiele 1972 in München”	Reinhart Heinsdorff, Lehen	Lettering on a plain edge “Citius Altius Fortius”	1972 (released in July 1971)	Proof and Circulated

Dimensions

Diameter	Weight	Thickness	Composition	Mintage	Mint Mark	Struck by	Issue Price
32.5 mm	15.5 grams	2.25 mm	.625 silver and .375 copper	All mint marks: 125,000 each Proof, 4,875,000 each Circulated	Below the Eagle's left claw: D, F, G, J	Bayer. Hauptmunzamt, Munich (D), Stuttgart (F), Karlsruhe (G), Hamburg (J)	Proof: 15 Deutsche Mark, Circulated: 10 Deutsche Mark

=== Series Three ===
Specifications

Denomination	Reverse Design	Artist	Obverse Design	Artist	Edge	Date of Issue	Finish
10 Deutsche Mark	A stylized German Eagle, and the legend: “Bundesrepublik Deutschland 10 Deutsche Mark”	Siegmund Schutz, Berlin	A male ball player, a female gymnast and the legend: “Spiele der XX Olympiade 1972 in München”	Siegmund Schutz, Berlin	Lettering on a plain edge “Citius Altius Fortius”	1972 (released in December 1971)	Proof and Circulated

Dimensions

Diameter	Weight	Thickness	Composition	Mintage	Mint Mark	Struck by	Issue Price
32.5 mm	15.5 grams	2.25 mm	.625 silver and .375 copper	All mint marks: 150,000 each Proof, 4,850,000 each Circulated	Under the Eagle's right wing: D, F, G, J	Bayer. Hauptmunzamt, Munich (D), Stuttgart (F), Karlsruhe (G), Hamburg (J)	Proof: 15 Deutsche Mark, Circulated: 10 Deutsche Mark

=== Series Four ===
Specifications

Denomination	Reverse Design	Artist	Obverse Design	Artist	Edge	Date of Issue	Finish
10 Deutsche Mark	A German Eagle with asymmetrical wings, and the legend: “Bundesrepublik Deutschland 10 Deutsche Mark”	Doris Waschk-Balz, Hamburg	An aerial view of Munich Olympic stadium and the legend: “Olympische Spiele München 26.8-10.9 1972”	Doris Waschk-Balz, Hamburg	Lettering on a plain edge “Citius Altius Fortius”	1972 (released in May 1972)	Proof and Circulated

Dimensions

Diameter	Weight	Thickness	Composition	Mintage	Mint Mark	Struck by	Issue Price
32.5 mm	15.5 grams	2.25 mm	.625 silver and .375 copper	All mint marks: 150,000 each Proof, 4,850,000 each Circulated	Below the legend: D, F, G, J	Bayer. Hauptmunzamt, Munich (D), Stuttgart (F), Karlsruhe (G), Hamburg (J)	Proof: 15 Deutsche Mark, Circulated: 10 Deutsche Mark

=== Series Five ===
Specifications

Denomination	Reverse Design	Artist	Obverse Design	Artist	Edge	Date of Issue	Finish
10 Deutsche Mark	A stylized German Eagle, and the legend: “Bundesrepublik Deutschland 10 Deutsche Mark”	Greta Lippi-Heinsen, Munich	The emblem of the 1972 Munich Games and the legend: “Spiele der XX Olympiade 1972 in München”	Greta Lippi-Heinsen, Munich	Lettering on a plain edge “Citius Altius Fortius”	1972 (released in July 1972)	Proof and Circulated

Dimensions

Diameter	Weight	Thickness	Composition	Mintage	Mint Mark	Struck by	Issue Price
32.5 mm	15.5 grams	2.25 mm	.625 silver and .375 copper	All mint marks: 150,000 each Proof, 2,350,000 each Circulated	Below the legend: D, F, G, J	Bayer. Hauptmunzamt, Munich (D), Stuttgart (F), Karlsruhe (G), Hamburg (J)	Proof: 15 Deutsche Mark, Circulated: 10 Deutsche Mark

=== Series Six ===
Specifications

Denomination	Reverse Design	Artist	Obverse Design	Artist	Edge	Date of Issue	Finish
10 Deutsche Mark	A stylized German Eagle, and the legend: “Bundesrepublik Deutschland 10 Deutsche Mark”	Siegmund Schutz, Berlin	The flame with a small Munich Olympic emblem, and the legend: “Spiele der XX Olympiade 1972 in München”	Siegmund Schutz, Berlin	Lettering on a plain edge “Citius Altius Fortius”	1972 (released in July 1972)	Proof and Circulated

Dimensions

Diameter	Weight	Thickness	Composition	Mintage	Mint Mark	Struck by	Issue Price
32.5 mm	15.5 grams	2.25 mm	.625 silver and .375 copper	All mint marks: 150,000 each Proof, 4,850,000 each Circulated	Below the legend: D, F, G, J	Bayer. Hauptmunzamt, Munich (D), Stuttgart (F), Karlsruhe (G), Hamburg (J)	Proof: 15 Deutsche Mark, Circulated: 10 Deutsche Mark

== 1976 Montreal Olympics ==
Starting in February 1973, the RCM engaged in a very ambitious program. At the behest of the Federal Government, led by then-Prime Minister Pierre Elliott Trudeau, it was agreed that these coins would help finance while commemorate the 1976 Summer Olympics. An Official Act – The Olympic (1976) Act – authorized the issue of the legal tender coins.

The plan was to have thirty coins: twenty-eight sterling (.925) silver coins with face values of $5 and $10, containing .723 Troy ounce and 1.44 Troy ounce of silver each respectively, and two gold coins. These coins would be categorized into seven series with each series configured into four coin sets (two five dollar coins and two ten dollar coins). The seven series were constituted as follows:

- Geographic
- Olympic Motifs
- Early Canadian Sports
- Olympic Track and Field Sports
- Olympic Summer Sports
- Olympic Team and Body Contact Sports
- Olympic Souvenirs

=== Series 1 ===
Year	Coin Number	Denomination	Reverse Design	Artist	Mintage	Issue Price (Encapsulated)	Issue Price (Standard Case)
1973	Coin No. 1	Ten Dollars	Map of World	Georges Huel	543,098	$12.00	$14.00
1973	Coin No. 2	Five Dollars	Map of North America	Georges Huel	537,898	$6.00	$7.50
1973	Coin No. 3	Ten Dollars	Montreal Skyline	Georges Huel	Included in mintage of No. 1	$12.00	$14.00
1973	Coin No. 4	Five Dollars	Kingston and Sailboats	Georges Huel	Included in mintage of No. 2	$6.00	$7.50

=== Series 2 ===
Year	Coin Number	Denomination	Reverse Design	Artist	Mintage	Issue Price (Encapsulated)	Issue Price (Standard Case)
1974	Coin No. 5	Ten Dollars	Head of Zeus	Anthony Mann	1,990,570	$15.00	$17.00
1974	Coin No. 6	Five Dollars	Athlete with Torch	Anthony Mann	1,974,939	$7.50	$9.00
1974	Coin No. 7	Ten Dollars	Temple of Zeus	Anthony Mann	Included in mintage of No. 5	$15.00	$17.00
1974	Coin No. 8	Five Dollars	Olympic Rings and Wreath	Anthony Mann	Included in mintage of No. 6	$7.50	$9.00

=== Series 3 ===
Year	Coin Number	Denomination	Reverse Design	Artist	Mintage	Issue Price (Encapsulated)	Issue Price (Standard Case)
1974	Coin No. 9	Ten Dollars	Lacrosse	Ken Danby	1,990,570	$15.75	$17.00
1974	Coin No. 10	Five Dollars	Canoeing	Ken Danby	1,974,939	$8.00	$9.00
1974	Coin No. 11	Ten Dollars	Cycling	Ken Danby	Included in mintage of No. 9	$15.75	$17.00
1974	Coin No. 12	Five Dollars	Rowing	Ken Danby	Included in mintage of No. 10	$8.00	$9.00

=== Series 4 ===
Year	Coin Number	Denomination	Reverse Design	Artist	Mintage	Issue Price (Encapsulated)	Issue Price (Standard Case)
1975	Coin No. 13	Ten Dollars	Men's Hurdles	Leo Yerxa	1,985,000	$15.75	$17.00
1975	Coin No. 14	Five Dollars	Marathon	Leo Yerxa	2,476,217	$8.00	$9.00
1975	Coin No. 15	Ten Dollars	Women's Shot Put	Leo Yerxa	Included in mintage of No. 13	$15.75	$17.00
1975	Coin No. 16	Five Dollars	Women's Javelin	Leo Yerxa	Included in mintage of No. 14	$8.00	$9.00

=== Series 5 ===
Year	Coin Number	Denomination	Reverse Design	Artist	Mintage	Issue Price (Encapsulated)	Issue Price (Standard Case)
1975	Coin No. 17	Ten Dollars	Paddling	Lynda Cooper	1,985,000	$15.75	$17.00
1975	Coin No. 18	Five Dollars	Diving	Lynda Cooper	2,476,217	$8.00	$9.00
1975	Coin No. 19	Ten Dollars	Sailing	Lynda Cooper	Included in mintage of No. 17	$15.75	$17.00
1975	Coin No. 20	Five Dollars	Swimming	Lynda Cooper	Included in mintage of No. 18	$8.00	$9.00

=== Series 6 ===
Year	Coin Number	Denomination	Reverse Design	Artist	Mintage	Issue Price (Encapsulated)	Issue Price (Standard Case)
1976	Coin No. 21	Ten Dollars	Field Hockey	Shigeo Fukada	1,887,630	$15.75	$17.00
1976	Coin No. 22	Five Dollars	Fencing	Shigeo Fukada	1,985,257	$8.00	$9.00
1976	Coin No. 23	Ten Dollars	Soccer	Shigeo Fukada	Included in mintage of No. 21	$15.75	$17.00
1976	Coin No. 24	Five Dollars	Boxing	Shigeo Fukada	Included in mintage of No. 22	$8.00	$9.00

=== Series 7 ===
Year	Coin Number	Denomination	Reverse Design	Artist	Mintage	Issue Price (Encapsulated)	Issue Price (Standard Case)
1976	Coin No. 25	Ten Dollars	Olympic Stadium	Elliott John Morrison	1,887,629	$15.75	$17.00
1976	Coin No. 26	Five Dollars	Olympic Village	Elliott John Morrison	1,985,257	$8.00	$9.00
1976	Coin No. 27	Ten Dollars	Olympic Velodrome	Elliott John Morrison	Included in mintage of No. 25	$15.75	$17.00
1976	Coin No. 28	Five Dollars	Olympic Flame	Elliott John Morrison	Included in mintage of No. 22	$8.00	$9.00

100 Dollar Gold

Year	Reverse Design	Artist	Mintage	Issue Price
1976	Olympic Commemorative (14 karat)	Dora de Pédery-Hunt	650,000	$105.00
1976	Olympic Commemorative (22 karat)	Dora de Pédery-Hunt	350,000	$150.00

== 1980 Moscow Olympics ==
IN PROGRESS The Moscow Olympics were the first Olympic games to be held in a socialist country. An Act of the Soviet government authorized the Ministry of Finance and the State Bank of the USSR to issue a 28-coin collection of five and ten roubles in proof and uncirculated qualities. There was also six proof and six uncirculated gold 100 roubles, five proof and five uncirculated platinum 150 roubles, and six proof and six uncirculated 1 rouble coins.

=== 1 Rouble ===
The dimensions are the same for all 1 Rouble coins.

- Dimensions

Diameter	Weight	Thickness	Composition	Mint Mark	Struck by	Issue Price
31 mm	12.8 grams	2.3 mm	Cupronickel	Leningrad Mint’s mintmark	Leningrad Mint	Proof: $4.00 US, Uncirculated: Face Value

- Specifications

Reverse Design	Artist	Obverse Design	Artist	Edge	Date of Issue	Finish	Mintage (Proof)	Mintage (Uncirculated)
The Moscow Olympic emblem and the legend, in Cyrillic script, meaning: “The XXII Olympiad Moscow 1980” and the year 1977	Yu. A. Lukjanov	The USSR's emblem, the Red Star surrounding the globe, 15 turns of ribbon representing the 15 republics of the Union, the legend, in Cyrillic script, meaning: “U.S.S.R. 1 Rouble”	S.M. Ivanov, modeler	Milled	1977	Proof and Uncirculated	335,000	8,665,000
The Kremlin with the Moscow Olympic emblem and the legend, in Cyrillic script, meaning: “The XXII Olympiad Moscow 1980” and the year 1977	V.A. Ermakov	The USSR's emblem, the Red Star surrounding the globe, 15 turns of ribbon representing the 15 republics of the Union, the legend, in Cyrillic script, meaning: “U.S.S.R. 1 Rouble”	S.M. Ivanov, modeler	Milled	1978	Proof and Uncirculated	509,500	6,490,500
The University of Moscow, the Olympic emblem and the legend, in Cyrillic script, meaning: “The XXII Olympiad Moscow 1980” and the year 1979	V.A. Ermakov	The USSR's emblem, the Red Star surrounding the globe, 15 turns of ribbon representing the 15 republics of the Union, the legend, in Cyrillic script, meaning: “U.S.S.R. 1 Rouble”	S.M. Ivanov, modeler	Milled	1979	Proof and Uncirculated	Proof: 334,500	Uncirculated: 4,665,500
The Cosmic Space Monument, the Olympic emblem and the legend, in Cyrillic script, meaning: “The XXII Olympiad Moscow 1980” and the year 1979	V.A. Ermakov	The USSR's emblem, the Red Star surrounding the globe, 15 turns of ribbon representing the 15 republics of the Union, the legend, in Cyrillic script, meaning: “U.S.S.R. 1 Rouble”	S.M. Ivanov, modeler	Milled	1979	Proof and Uncirculated	Proof: 334,500	Uncirculated: 4,665,500
The Monument of Yuri Dolgoruky, founder of Moscow, the Olympic emblem and the legend, in Cyrillic script, meaning: “"The XXII Olympiad Moscow 1980" and the year 1980	V.A. Ermakov	The USSR's emblem, the Red Star surrounding the globe, 15 turns of ribbon representing the 15 republics of the Union, the legend, in Cyrillic script, meaning: “U.S.S.R. 1 Rouble”	S.M. Ivanov, modeler	Milled	1980	Proof and Uncirculated	Proof: 509,500	Uncirculated: 4,490,500
The Olympic torch, the Olympic emblem and the legend, in Cyrillic script, meaning: “The XXII Olympiad Moscow 1980” and the year 1980	V.A. Ermakov	The USSR's emblem, the Red Star surrounding the globe, 15 turns of ribbon representing the 15 republics of the Union, the legend, in Cyrillic script, meaning: “U.S.S.R. 1 Rouble”	S.M. Ivanov, modeler	Milled	1980	Proof and Uncirculated	Proof: 509,500	Uncirculated: 4,490,500

=== Series One (Geographic) ===
The dimensions are the same for all the Series One Five Roubles coins.

- Dimensions

Diameter	Weight	Thickness	Composition	Mint Mark	Struck by
33 mm	16.67 grams	2.4 mm	.900 silver and .100 copper	Leningrad/Moscow Mint's Mintmark	Leningrad/Moscow Mint

- Specifications

Denomination	Reverse Design	Artist	Obverse Design	Artist	Edge	Date of Issue	Finish	Mintage	Issue Price
5 Roubles	A view of Tallinn, sailboats in the foreground, the Olympic emblem and the legend, in Cyrillic script, meaning: “The XXII Olympiad Moscow 1980” and the year 1977.	V.A. Ermakov	The USSR's emblem, the Red Star surrounding the globe, 15 turns of ribbon representing the 15 republics of the Union, the legend, in Cyrillic script, meaning: “U.S.S.R. 5 Roubles”	L.S. Kamshilov and P.K. Potapov, modelers	Milled	1977	Proof and Uncirculated	PR 122,167, UNC 251,562	Proof: $20 US, Unc: $15 US
5 Roubles	A view of Kyiv, the Olympic emblem and the legend, in Cyrillic script, meaning: “The XXII Olympiad Moscow 1980” and the year 1977.	Yu. A. Lukjanov	The USSR's emblem, the Red Star surrounding the globe, 15 turns of ribbon representing the 15 republics of the Union, the legend, in Cyrillic script, meaning: “U.S.S.R. 5 Roubles”	L.S. Kamshilov and P.K. Potapov, modelers	Milled	1977	Proof and Uncirculated	PR 121,137, UNC 250,037	Proof: $20 US, Unc: $15 US
5 Roubles	A view of Minsk, the Olympic emblem and the legend, in Cyrillic script, meaning: “The XXII Olympiad Moscow 1980” and the year 1977.	Yu. A. Lukjanov	The USSR's emblem, the Red Star surrounding the globe, 15 turns of ribbon representing the 15 republics of the Union, the legend, in Cyrillic script, meaning: “U.S.S.R. 5 Roubles”	L.S. Kamshilov and P.K. Potapov, modelers	Milled	1977	Proof and Uncirculated	PR 121,137, UNC 250,040	Proof: $20 US, Unc: $15 US
5 Roubles	A view of Leningrad, the Olympic emblem and the legend, in Cyrillic script, meaning: “The XXII Olympiad Moscow 1980” and the year 1977.	V.V. Nikitin	The USSR's emblem, the Red Star surrounding the globe, 15 turns of ribbon representing the 15 republics of the Union, the legend, in Cyrillic script, meaning: “U.S.S.R. 5 Roubles”	L.S. Kamshilov and P.K. Potapov, modelers	Milled	1977	Proof and Uncirculated	PR 121,417, UNC 250,411	Proof: $20 US, Unc: $15 US

The dimensions are the same for all the Series One Ten Roubles coins.

- Dimensions

Diameter	Weight	Thickness	Composition	Mint Mark	Struck by
39 mm	33.3 grams	3.3 mm	.900 silver and .100 copper	Leningrad/Moscow Mint's Mintmark	Leningrad/Moscow Mint

- Specifications

Denomination	Reverse Design	Artist	Obverse Design	Artist	Edge	Date of Issue	Finish	Mintage	Issue Price
10 Roubles	The Moscow Olympic emblem, superimposed on the map of the USSR, and the legend, “The XXII Olympiad Moscow 1980” and the year 1977.	V.A. Ermakov	The USSR's emblem, the Red Star surrounding the globe, 15 turns of ribbon representing the 15 republics of the Union, the legend, in Cyrillic script, meaning: “U.S.S.R. 5 Roubles”	S.M. Ivanov	Milled	1977	Proof and Uncirculated	PR 121,137, UNC 250,040	Proof: $35 US, Unc: $30 US
10 Roubles	The Kremlin, and Red Square, the Olympic emblem and the legend,“The XXII Olympiad Moscow 1980” and the year 1977.	V.A. Ermakov	The USSR's emblem, the Red Star surrounding the globe, 15 turns of ribbon representing the 15 republics of the Union, the legend, in Cyrillic script, meaning: “U.S.S.R. 5 Roubles”	S.M. Ivanov	Milled	1977	Proof and Uncirculated	PR 121,423, UNC 250,414	Proof: $35 US, Unc: $30 US

=== Series Two – Citius ===
Five Roubles The dimensions are the same for all the Series Two Five Roubles coins.

- Dimensions

Diameter	Weight	Thickness	Composition	Mint Mark	Struck by
33 mm	16.67 grams	2.4 mm	.900 silver and .100 copper	Leningrad/Moscow Mint's Mintmark	Leningrad Mint

- Specifications

Denomination	Reverse Design	Artist	Obverse Design	Artist	Edge	Date of Issue	Finish	Mintage	Issue Price
5 Roubles	Running, the Olympic emblem and the legend, in Cyrillic script, meaning: “The XXII Olympiad Moscow 1980” and the year 1978.	V.A. Ermakov	The USSR's emblem, the Red Star surrounding the globe, 15 turns of ribbon representing the 15 republics of the Union, the legend, in Cyrillic script, meaning: “U.S.S.R. 5 Roubles”	L.S. Kamshilov and P.K. Potapov, modelers	Milled	1978	Proof and Uncirculated	PR 118,353, UNC 226,653	Proof: $20 US, Unc: $15 US
5 Roubles	Swimming, the Olympic emblem and the legend, meaning: “The XXII Olympiad Moscow 1980” and the year 1978.	V.A. Ermakov	The USSR's emblem, the Red Star surrounding the globe, 15 turns of ribbon representing the 15 republics of the Union, the legend, in Cyrillic script, meaning: “U.S.S.R. 5 Roubles”	L.S. Kamshilov and P.K. Potapov, modelers	Milled	1978	Proof and Uncirculated	PR 118,353, UNC 226,655	Proof: $20 US, Unc: $15 US

Ten Roubles The dimensions are the same for all the Series Two Ten Roubles coins.

- Dimensions

Diameter	Weight	Thickness	Composition	Mint Mark	Struck by
39 mm	33.3 grams	3.3 mm	.900 silver and .100 copper	Leningrad/Moscow Mint's Mintmark	Leningrad/Moscow Mint

- Specifications

Denomination	Reverse Design	Artist	Obverse Design	Artist	Edge	Date of Issue	Finish	Mintage	Issue Price
10 Roubles	Cycling, the Olympic emblem and the legend, in Cyrillic script, meaning: “The XXII Olympiad Moscow 1980” and the year 1978.	V.A. Ermakov	The USSR's emblem, the Red Star surrounding the globe, 15 turns of ribbon representing the 15 republics of the Union, the legend, in Cyrillic script, meaning: “U.S.S.R. 10 Roubles”	S.M. Ivanov, modelers	Milled	1978	Proof and Uncirculated	PR 118,453, UNC 226,670	Proof: $35 US, Unc: $30 US
10 Roubles	Canoeing, the Olympic emblem and the legend, in Cyrillic script, meaning: “The XXII Olympiad Moscow 1980” and the year 1978.	V.A. Ermakov	The USSR's emblem, the Red Star surrounding the globe, 15 turns of ribbon representing the 15 republics of the Union, the legend, in Cyrillic script, meaning: “U.S.S.R. 10 Roubles”	S.M. Ivanov, modelers	Milled	1978	Proof and Uncirculated	PR 118,403, UNC 226,404	Proof: $35 US, Unc: $30 US
10 Roubles	Equestrian, the Olympic emblem and the legend, in Cyrillic script, meaning: “The XXII Olympiad Moscow 1980” and the year 1978.	V.A. Ermakov	The USSR's emblem, the Red Star surrounding the globe, 15 turns of ribbon representing the 15 republics of the Union, the legend, in Cyrillic script, meaning: “U.S.S.R. 10 Roubles”	S.M. Ivanov, modelers	Milled	1978	Proof and Uncirculated	PR 118,409, UNC 226,403	Proof: $35 US, Unc: $30 US

=== Series Three – Altius ===
Five Roubles The dimensions are the same for all the Series Three Five Roubles coins.

- Dimensions

Diameter	Weight	Thickness	Composition	Mint Mark	Struck by
33 mm	16.67 grams	2.4 mm	.900 silver and .100 copper	Leningrad/Moscow Mint's Mintmark	Leningrad/Moscow Mint

- Specifications

Denomination	Reverse Design	Artist	Obverse Design	Artist	Edge	Date of Issue	Finish	Mintage	Issue Price
5 Roubles	High jumping, the Olympic emblem and the legend, in Cyrillic script, meaning: “The XXII Olympiad Moscow 1980” and the year 1978.	V.A. Ermakov	The USSR's emblem, the Red Star surrounding the globe, 15 turns of ribbon representing the 15 republics of the Union, the legend, in Cyrillic script, meaning: “U.S.S.R. 5 Roubles”	L.S. Kamshilov and P.K. Potapov, modelers	Milled	1978	Proof and Uncirculated	PR 119,143, UNC 220,583	Proof: $20 US, Unc: $15 US
5 Roubles	Equestrian show jumping, the Olympic emblem and the legend, meaning: “The XXII Olympiad Moscow 1980” and the year 1978.	V.A. Ermakov	The USSR's emblem, the Red Star surrounding the globe, 15 turns of ribbon representing the 15 republics of the Union, the legend, in Cyrillic script, meaning: “U.S.S.R. 5 Roubles”	L.S. Kamshilov and P.K. Potapov, modelers	Milled	1978	Proof and Uncirculated	PR 119,143, UNC 220,603	Proof: $20 US, Unc: $15 US

- Ten Roubles

The dimensions are the same for all the Series Three Ten Roubles coins.

- Dimensions

Diameter	Weight	Thickness	Composition	Mint Mark	Struck by
39 mm	33.3 grams	3.3 mm	.900 silver and .100 copper	Leningrad/Moscow Mint's Mintmark	Leningrad/Moscow Mint

- Specifications

Denomination	Reverse Design	Artist	Obverse Design	Artist	Edge	Date of Issue	Finish	Mintage	Issue Price
10 Roubles	Pole vaulting, the Olympic emblem and the legend, in Cyrillic script, meaning: “The XXII Olympiad Moscow 1980” and the year 1978.	V.A. Ermakov	The USSR's emblem, the Red Star surrounding the globe, 15 turns of ribbon representing the 15 republics of the Union, the legend, in Cyrillic script, meaning: “U.S.S.R. 10 Roubles”	S.M. Ivanov, modelers	Milled	1978	Proof and Uncirculated	PR 119,343, UNC 220,583	Proof: $35 US, Unc: $30 US
10 Roubles	Basketball, the Olympic emblem and the legend, in Cyrillic script, meaning: “The XXII Olympiad Moscow 1980” and the year 1979.	V.A. Ermakov	The USSR's emblem, the Red Star surrounding the globe, 15 turns of ribbon representing the 15 republics of the Union, the legend, in Cyrillic script, meaning: “U.S.S.R. 10 Roubles”	S.M. Ivanov, modelers	Milled	1979	Proof and Uncirculated	PR 119,243, UNC 220,583	Proof: $35 US, Unc: $30 US
10 Roubles	Volleyball, the Olympic emblem and the legend, in Cyrillic script, meaning: “The XXII Olympiad Moscow 1980” and the year 1979.	V.A. Ermakov	The USSR's emblem, the Red Star surrounding the globe, 15 turns of ribbon representing the 15 republics of the Union, the legend, in Cyrillic script, meaning: “U.S.S.R. 10 Roubles”	S.M. Ivanov, modelers	Milled	1979	Proof and Uncirculated	PR 119,243, UNC 220,583	Proof: $35 US, Unc: $30 US

=== Series Four – Fortius ===
- Five Roubles

The dimensions are the same for all the Series Four Five Roubles coins.

- Dimensions

Diameter	Weight	Thickness	Composition	Mint Mark	Struck by
33 mm	16.67 grams	2.4 mm	.900 silver and .100 copper	Leningrad/Moscow Mint's Mintmark	Leningrad/Moscow Mint

- Specifications

Denomination	Reverse Design	Artist	Obverse Design	Artist	Edge	Date of Issue	Finish	Mintage	Issue Price
5 Roubles	Weightlifting, the Olympic emblem and the legend, in Cyrillic script, meaning: “The XXII Olympiad Moscow 1980” and the year 1979.	V.A. Ermakov	The USSR's emblem, the Red Star surrounding the globe, 15 turns of ribbon representing the 15 republics of the Union, the legend, in Cyrillic script, meaning: “U.S.S.R. 5 Roubles”	L.S. Kamshilov and P.K. Potapov, modelers	Milled	1979	Proof and Uncirculated	PR 107,928, UNC 207,078	Proof: $20 US, Unc: $15 US
5 Roubles	Hammer throw, the Olympic emblem and the legend, meaning: “The XXII Olympiad Moscow 1980” and the year 1979.	V.A. Ermakov	The USSR's emblem, the Red Star surrounding the globe, 15 turns of ribbon representing the 15 republics of the Union, the legend, in Cyrillic script, meaning: “U.S.S.R. 5 Roubles”	L.S. Kamshilov and P.K. Potapov, modelers	Milled	1979	Proof and Uncirculated	PR 107,928, UNC 207,078	Proof: $20 US, Unc: $15 US

- Ten Roubles

The dimensions are the same for all the Series Four Ten Roubles coins.

- Dimensions

Diameter	Weight	Thickness	Composition	Mint Mark	Struck by
39 mm	33.3 grams	3.3 mm	.900 silver and .100 copper	Leningrad/Moscow Mint's Mintmark	Leningrad/Moscow Mint

- Specifications

Denomination	Reverse Design	Artist	Obverse Design	Artist	Edge	Date of Issue	Finish	Mintage	Issue Price
10 Roubles	Ancient version of weightlifting, the Olympic emblem and the legend, in Cyrillic script, meaning: “The XXII Olympiad Moscow 1980” and the year 1979.	V.A. Ermakov	The USSR's emblem, the Red Star surrounding the globe, 15 turns of ribbon representing the 15 republics of the Union, the legend, in Cyrillic script, meaning: “U.S.S.R. 10 Roubles”	S.M. Ivanov, modelers	Milled	1979	Proof and Uncirculated	PR 107,928, UNC 207,078	Proof: $35 US, Unc: $30 US
10 Roubles	Boxing, the Olympic emblem and the legend, in Cyrillic script, meaning: “The XXII Olympiad Moscow 1980” and the year 1979.	V.A. Ermakov	The USSR's emblem, the Red Star surrounding the globe, 15 turns of ribbon representing the 15 republics of the Union, the legend, in Cyrillic script, meaning: “U.S.S.R. 10 Roubles”	S.M. Ivanov, modelers	Milled	1979	Proof and Uncirculated	PR 107,928, UNC 207,078	Proof: $35 US, Unc: $30 US
10 Roubles	Judo, the Olympic emblem and the legend, in Cyrillic script, meaning: "The XXII Olympiad Moscow 1980" and the year 1979.	V.A. Ermakov	The USSR's emblem, the Red Star surrounding the globe, 15 turns of ribbon representing the 15 republics of the Union, the legend, in Cyrillic script, meaning: "U.S.S.R. 10 Roubles"	S.M. Ivanov, modelers	Milled	1979	Proof and Uncirculated	PR 107,928, UNC 207,078	Proof: $35 US, Unc: $30 US

=== Series Five – Sports and Beauty ===
- Five Roubles

The dimensions are the same for all the Series Five Five Roubles coins.

- Dimensions

Diameter	Weight	Thickness	Composition	Mint Mark	Struck by
33 mm	16.67 grams	2.4 mm	.900 silver and .100 copper	Leningrad/Moscow Mint's Mintmark	Leningrad/Moscow Mint

- Specifications

Denomination	Reverse Design	Artist	Obverse Design	Artist	Edge	Date of Issue	Finish	Mintage	Issue Price
5 Roubles	Gymnastics, the Olympic emblem and the legend, in Cyrillic script, meaning: “The XXII Olympiad Moscow 1980” and the year 1980.	V.A. Ermakov	The USSR's emblem, the Red Star surrounding the globe, 15 turns of ribbon representing the 15 republics of the Union, the legend, in Cyrillic script, meaning: “U.S.S.R. 5 Roubles”	L.S. Kamshilov and P.K. Potapov, modelers	Milled	1980	Proof and Uncirculated	PR 95,420, UNC 126,220	Proof: $20 US, Unc: $15 US
5 Roubles	Archery, the Olympic emblem and the legend, meaning: “The XXII Olympiad Moscow 1980” and the year 1980.	V.A. Ermakov	The USSR's emblem, the Red Star surrounding the globe, 15 turns of ribbon representing the 15 republics of the Union, the legend, in Cyrillic script, meaning: “U.S.S.R. 5 Roubles”	L.S. Kamshilov and P.K. Potapov, modelers	Milled	1980	Proof and Uncirculated	PR 95,420, UNC 126,220	Proof: $20 US, Unc: $15 US

- Ten Roubles

The dimensions are the same for all the Series Five Ten Roubles coins.

- Dimensions

Diameter	Weight	Thickness	Composition	Mint Mark	Struck by
39 mm	33.3 grams	3.3 mm	.900 silver and .100 copper	Leningrad/Moscow Mint's Mintmark	Leningrad/Moscow Mint

- Specifications

Denomination	Reverse Design	Artist	Obverse Design	Artist	Edge	Date of Issue	Finish	Mintage	Issue Price
10 Roubles	Dance of an eagle and khuresh, the Olympic emblem and the legend, in Cyrillic script, meaning: “The XXII Olympiad Moscow 1980” and the year 1980.	V.A. Ermakov	The USSR's emblem, the Red Star surrounding the globe, 15 turns of ribbon representing the 15 republics of the Union, the legend, in Cyrillic script, meaning: “U.S.S.R. 10 Roubles”	S.M. Ivanov, modelers	Milled	1980	Proof and Uncirculated	PR 95,420 UNC 126,220	Proof: $35 US, Unc: $30 US

=== Series Six – Team Sports ===
Five Roubles The dimensions are the same for all the Series Six Five Roubles coins.

- Dimensions

Diameter	Weight	Thickness	Composition	Mint Mark	Struck by
33 mm	16.67 grams	2.4 mm	.900 silver and .100 copper	Leningrad/Moscow Mint's Mintmark	Leningrad/Moscow Mint

- Specifications

Denomination	Reverse Design	Artist	Obverse Design	Artist	Edge	Date of Issue	Finish	Mintage	Issue Price
5 Roubles	Ball and Stick Game, the Olympic emblem and the legend, in Cyrillic script, meaning: “The XXII Olympiad Moscow 1980” and the year 1980.	V.A. Ermakov	The USSR's emblem, the Red Star surrounding the globe, 15 turns of ribbon representing the 15 republics of the Union, the legend, in Cyrillic script, meaning: “U.S.S.R. 5 Roubles”	L.S. Kamshilov and P.K. Potapov, modelers	Milled	1980	Proof and Uncirculated	PR 95,520, UNC 126,220	Proof: $20 US, Unc: $15 US
5 Roubles	Playing ball on the horses, the Olympic emblem and the legend, meaning: “The XXII Olympiad Moscow 1980” and the year 1980.	V.A. Ermakov	The USSR's emblem, the Red Star surrounding the globe, 15 turns of ribbon representing the 15 republics of the Union, the legend, in Cyrillic script, meaning: “U.S.S.R. 5 Roubles”	L.S. Kamshilov and P.K. Potapov, modelers	Milled	1980	Proof and Uncirculated	PR 95,520, UNC 126,220	Proof: $20 US, Unc: $15 US

Ten Roubles The dimensions are the same for all the Series Six Ten Roubles coins.

- Dimensions

Diameter	Weight	Thickness	Composition	Mint Mark	Struck by
39 mm	33.3 grams	3.3 mm	.900 silver and .100 copper	Leningrad/Moscow Mint's Mintmark	Leningrad/Moscow Mint

- Specifications

Denomination	Reverse Design	Artist	Obverse Design	Artist	Edge	Date of Issue	Finish	Mintage	Issue Price
10 Roubles	Tug of War, the Olympic emblem and the legend, in Cyrillic script, meaning: “The XXII Olympiad Moscow 1980” and the year 1980.	V.A. Ermakov	The USSR's emblem, the Red Star surrounding the globe, 15 turns of ribbon representing the 15 republics of the Union, the legend, in Cyrillic script, meaning: “U.S.S.R. 10 Roubles”	S.M. Ivanov, modelers	Milled	1980	Proof and Uncirculated	PR 95,420, UNC 126,220	Proof: $35 US, Unc: $30 US
10 Roubles	Reindeer Race, the Olympic emblem and the legend, in Cyrillic script, meaning: “The XXII Olympiad Moscow 1980” and the year 1980.	V.A. Ermakov	The USSR's emblem, the Red Star surrounding the globe, 15 turns of ribbon representing the 15 republics of the Union, the legend, in Cyrillic script, meaning: “U.S.S.R. 10 Roubles”	S.M. Ivanov, modelers	Milled	1980	Proof and Uncirculated	PR 95,420, UNC 126,220	Proof: $35 US, Unc: $30 US

=== 100 Roubles ===
The dimensions are the same for all the 100 Roubles coins.

- Dimensions

Diameter	Weight	Thickness	Composition	Mint Mark	Struck by
30 mm	17.28 grams	1.8 mm	.900 gold and .100 copper	Leningrad/Moscow Mint's Mintmark	Leningrad/Moscow Mint

- Specifications

Denomination	Reverse Design	Artist	Obverse Design	Artist	Edge	Date of Issue	Finish	Mintage	Issue Price
100 Roubles	Sport and Peace symbol, illustrated by a globe and palm branch behind the Olympic emblem and the legend, meaning: “The XXII Olympiad Moscow 1980” and the year 1977.	V.A. Ermakov	The USSR's emblem, the Red Star surrounding the globe, 15 turns of ribbon representing the 15 republics of the Union, the legend, in Cyrillic script, meaning: “U.S.S.R. 100 Roubles”	S.M. Ivanov, modelers	Milled	1977	Proof and Brilliant Uncirculated	PR 38,036, UNC 23,536	Proof: $235 US, BU: $200 US
100 Roubles	Lenin Central Stadium, the Olympic emblem and the legend, meaning: “The XXII Olympiad Moscow 1980” and the year 1978.	V.A. Ermakov	The USSR's emblem, the Red Star surrounding the globe, 15 turns of ribbon representing the 15 republics of the Union, the legend, in Cyrillic script, meaning: “U.S.S.R. 100 Roubles”	S.M. Ivanov, modelers	Milled	1978	Proof and Brilliant Uncirculated	PR 45,317 UNC 62,023	Proof: $235 US, BU: $200 US
100 Roubles	Rowing Canal in Krylatskoye, the Olympic emblem and the legend, meaning: “The XXII Olympiad Moscow 1980” and the year 1978.	V.A. Ermakov	The USSR's emblem, the Red Star surrounding the globe, 15 turns of ribbon representing the 15 republics of the Union, the legend, in Cyrillic script, meaning: “U.S.S.R. 100 Roubles”	S.M. Ivanov, modelers	Milled	1978	Proof and Brilliant Uncirculated	PR 43,253 UNC 57,153	Proof: $235 US, BU: $200 US
100 Roubles	Velodrome, the Olympic emblem and the legend, meaning: “The XXII Olympiad Moscow 1980” and the year 1979.	V.A. Ermakov	The USSR's emblem, the Red Star surrounding the globe, 15 turns of ribbon representing the 15 republics of the Union, the legend, in Cyrillic script, meaning: “U.S.S.R. 100 Roubles”	S.M. Ivanov, modelers	Milled	1979	Proof and Brilliant Uncirculated	PR 42,213 UNC 54,913	Proof: $235 US, BU: $200 US
100 Roubles	Palace of Water Sports Druzhba, the Olympic emblem and the legend, meaning: “The XXII Olympiad Moscow 1980” and the year 1979.	V.A. Ermakov	The USSR's emblem, the Red Star surrounding the globe, 15 turns of ribbon representing the 15 republics of the Union, the legend, in Cyrillic script, meaning: “U.S.S.R. 100 Roubles”	S.M. Ivanov, modelers	Milled	1979	Proof and Brilliant Uncirculated	PR 38,003 UNC 53,503	Proof: $235 US, BU: $200 US
100 Roubles	The Olympic flame, the Olympic emblem and the legend, meaning: “The XXII Olympiad Moscow 1980” and the year 1980.	V.A. Ermakov	The USSR's emblem, the Red Star surrounding the globe, 15 turns of ribbon representing the 15 republics of the Union, the legend, in Cyrillic script, meaning: “U.S.S.R. 100 Roubles”	S.M. Ivanov, modelers	Milled	1980	Proof and Brilliant Uncirculated	PR 27,820 UNC 24,620	Proof: $235 US, BU: $200 US

=== 150 Roubles ===
The dimensions are the same for all the 150 Roubles coins.

- Dimensions

Diameter	Weight	Thickness	Composition	Mint Mark	Struck by
28.6 mm	15.55 grams	1.5 mm	.9993 platinum	Leningrad/Moscow Mint's Mintmark	Leningrad Mint

- Specifications

Denomination	Reverse Design	Artist	Obverse Design	Artist	Edge	Date of Issue	Finish	Mintage	Issue Price
150 Roubles	The emblem of the Moscow Olympic Games, and the legend, meaning: “The XXII Olympiad Moscow 1980” and the year 1977.	V.A. Ermakov	The USSR's emblem, the Red Star surrounding the globe, 15 turns of ribbon representing the 15 republics of the Union, the legend, in Cyrillic script, meaning: “U.S.S.R. 150 Roubles”	S.M. Ivanov, modelers	Milled	1977	Proof and Uncirculated	PR 24,160, UNC 9,910	Proof: $488 US, Unc: $465 US
150 Roubles	Discus thrower, the Olympic emblem and the legend, meaning: “The XXII Olympiad Moscow 1980” and the year 1978.	V.A. Ermakov	The USSR's emblem, the Red Star surrounding the globe, 15 turns of ribbon representing the 15 republics of the Union, the legend, in Cyrillic script, meaning: “U.S.S.R. 150 Roubles”	S.M. Ivanov, modelers	Milled	1978	Proof and Uncirculated	PR 19,853, UNC 13,403	Proof: $488 US, Unc: $465 US
150 Roubles	Ancient wrestlers (Greek statue from Uffizi museum in Florence, Italy), the Olympic emblem and the legend, meaning: “The XXII Olympiad Moscow 1980” and the year 1979.	V.A. Ermakov	The USSR's emblem, the Red Star surrounding the globe, 15 turns of ribbon representing the 15 republics of the Union, the legend, in Cyrillic script, meaning: “U.S.S.R. 150 Roubles”	S.M. Ivanov, modelers	Milled	1979	Proof and Uncirculated	PR 18,978, UNC 13,578	Proof: $488 US, Unc: $465 US
150 Roubles	Ancient chariot from early Greek games, the Olympic emblem and the legend, meaning: “The XXII Olympiad Moscow 1980” and the year 1979.	V.A. Ermakov	The USSR's emblem, the Red Star surrounding the globe, 15 turns of ribbon representing the 15 republics of the Union, the legend, in Cyrillic script, meaning: “U.S.S.R. 150 Roubles”	S.M. Ivanov, modelers	Milled	1979	Proof and Uncirculated	PR 17,078, UNC 9,728	Proof: $488 US, Unc: $465 US
150 Roubles	Ancient runners, the Olympic emblem and the legend, meaning: “The XXII Olympiad Moscow 1980” and the year 1980.	V.A. Ermakov	The USSR's emblem, the Red Star surrounding the globe, 15 turns of ribbon representing the 15 republics of the Union, the legend, in Cyrillic script, meaning: “U.S.S.R. 150 Roubles”	S.M. Ivanov, modelers	Milled	1980	Proof and Uncirculated	PR 12,870, UNC 7,820	Proof: $488 US, Unc: $465 US

== 1984 Los Angeles Olympics ==
The State of California and the municipality refused to finance the Games. The U.S.S.R. refused to participate in the games as well. Legislation from July 22, 1982 authorized an issue of Olympic coins. The Bill allowed the striking of six coins bearing three different designs. The United States struck its first Olympic coins ever, and its first gold coin in fifty years. Uncirculated Coins were produced at the United States Mint’s facilities in Denver, Philadelphia, San Francisco and West Point.

=== One Dollar ===
- Dimensions

Diameter	Weight	Thickness	Composition	Mint Mark	Struck by
38.1 mm	26.73 grams (containing 0.77 Troy ounce of Silver)	2.79 mm	.900 silver and .100 copper	D for Denver, P for Philadelphia, S for San Francisco.	United States Mint

- Specifications

Reverse Design	Artist	Obverse Design	Artist	Edge	Date of Issue	Finish	Mintage (Proof)	Mintage (Denver)	Mintage (Philadelphia)	Issue Price
The head of an Eagle, the words “E Pluribus Unum, One Dollar”, and United States of America	Elizabeth Jones	A Greek discus thrower, the Olympic emblem of Los Angeles and the legend: “Los Angeles XXIII Olympiad”	Elizabeth Jones	Milled	1983	Proof: 1,577,025	174,014	294,543	174,014	Proof: $24.95, Unc: $28.00
The head of an Eagle, the words “E Pluribus Unum, One Dollar”, and United States of America	Elizabeth Jones	Graham's sculpture and the Los Angeles Memorial Coliseum in the background	Elizabeth Jones	Milled	1984	Proof: 1,801,210	116,675	217,954	116,675	Proof: $32, Unc: $28.00

=== Ten Dollars ===
- Dimensions

Diameter	Weight	Thickness	Composition	Mint Mark	Struck by
26.92 mm	16.718 grams (containing .484 Troy ounces of Gold)	2.24 mm	.900 gold and .100 copper	D for the Denver Mint, P for the Philadelphia Mint, S for the San Francisco Mint, W for West Point.	United States Mint

- Specifications

Reverse Design	Artist	Obverse Design	Artist	Edge	Date of Issue	Finish	Mintage (Denver)	Mintage (Philadelphia)	Mintage (San Francisco)	Mintage (West Point)	Issue Price
An eagle, the words ten dollars, and “United States of America”	John Mercanti	Two Olympic torch runners, the Olympic rings, the legend “Olympiad XXIII”, the words “Los Angeles” and “In God We Trust”, and the year 1984	James Peed and John Mercanti	Milled	1984	Proof and Uncirculated	381,085	34,533	33,309	48,551	Part of 3 coin set, Proof: $352.00, Uncirculated: $395.00

== 1988 Seoul Games ==
Specifications

=== 1000 Won ===
Denomination	Diameter	Weight	Thickness	Composition	Mint Mark
1000 Won	30 mm	12 grams	2.2 mm	Cupronickel (75 copper and 25 nickel)	No Mintmarks

=== 2000 Won ===
Denomination	Diameter	Weight	Thickness	Composition	Mint Mark
2000 Won	33 mm	17 grams	2.6 mm	100 Nickel	No Mintmarks

=== 5000 Won ===
Denomination	Diameter	Weight	Thickness	Composition	Mint Mark
5000 Won	32 mm	16.81 grams (containing ½ Troy Oz. of Silver)	2.45 mm	925 silver and 75 copper	No Mintmarks

=== 10,000 Won ===
Denomination	Diameter	Weight	Thickness	Composition	Mint Mark
10,000 Won	40 mm	33.62 grams (containing 1 Troy Oz. of Silver)	3.0 mm	925 silver and 75 copper	No Mintmarks

=== 25,000 Won ===
Denomination	Diameter	Weight	Thickness	Composition	Mint Mark
25,000 Won	27 mm	16.813 grams (containing 1/2 Troy Oz. of Gold)	2.0 mm	925 gold, 30 silver and 45 copper	No Mintmarks

=== 50,000 Won ===
Denomination	Diameter	Weight	Thickness	Composition	Mint Mark
50,000 Won	35 mm	33.626 grams (containing 1 Troy oz. of Gold)	2.4 mm	925 gold, 30 silver, 45 copper	No Mintmarks

=== Series One ===
Denomination	Reverse Design	Artist	Obverse Design	Artist	Edge	Date of Issue	Finish	Mintage	Issue Price
50,000 Won	Emblem of Republic of Korea, Taeguk surrounded bu five roses of Sharon.	D.H. Oh and D.K. Min	A Turtle Ship	I.C. Ham	Milled	February 1986	Proof	30,000	$750.00 US
25,000 Won	Emblem of Republic of Korea, Taeguk surrounded bu five roses of Sharon.	D.H. Oh and D.K. Min	Farmer's Dance	D.H. Oh	Milled	February 1986	Proof and Brilliant Uncirculated	113,664 (Pr), 31,315 (BU)	(Pr) $350.00 US, (BU) $300.00 US
10,000 Won	Emblem of Republic of Korea, Taeguk surrounded bu five roses of Sharon.	D.H. Oh and D.K. Min	A Marathon Runner	K.H. Kim	Milled	February 1986	Proof and Brilliant Uncirculated	257,648 (Pr), 68,902 (BU)	(Pr) $37.50 US, (BU) $30.00 US
10,000 Won	Emblem of Republic of Korea, Taeguk surrounded bu five roses of Sharon.	D.H. Oh and D.K. Min	Diving	D.K. Min	Milled	February 1986	Proof and Brilliant Uncirculated	247,181 (Pr), 66,103 (BU)	(Pr) $37.50 US, (BU) $30.00 US
5,000 Won	Emblem of Republic of Korea, Taeguk surrounded bu five roses of Sharon.	D.H. Oh and D.K. Min	Tug of War, Jul Dali Ki, one of the Lunar New Year celebrations on the first Full Moon Day	C.S. Park	Milled	February 1986	Proof and Brilliant Uncirculated	225,138 (Pr), 87,988 (BU)	(Pr) $22.50 US, (BU) $15.00 US
5,000 Won	Emblem of Republic of Korea, Taeguk surrounded bu five roses of Sharon.	D.H. Oh and D.K. Min	The Hodori, the Olympic mascot	D.K. Min	Milled	February 1986	Proof and Brilliant Uncirculated	240,211 (Pr), 93,879 (BU)	(Pr) $22.50 US, (BU) $15.00 US
2,000 Won	Emblem of Republic of Korea, Taeguk surrounded bu five roses of Sharon.	D.H. Oh and D.K. Min	Boxing	Y.S. Lee and I.C. Ham	Milled	February 1986	Proof and Brilliant Uncirculated	143,936 (Pr), 337,454 (BU)	(Pr) $16.50 US, (BU) $12.00 US
1,000 Won	Emblem of Republic of Korea, Taeguk surrounded bu five roses of Sharon.	D.H. Oh and D.K. Min	Basketball	D.H. Oh	Milled	February 1986	Proof and Brilliant Uncirculated	144,506 (Pr), 404,948 (BU)	(Pr) $10.00 US, (BU) $7.00 US

=== Series Two ===
Denomination	Reverse Design	Artist	Obverse Design	Artist	Edge	Date of Issue	Finish	Mintage	Issue Price
50,000 Won	Emblem of Republic of Korea, Taeguk surrounded bu five roses of Sharon.	D.H. Oh and D.K. Min	South Grand Gate, known as Namdaemun	K.H. Kim	Milled	August 1987	Proof	30,000	$750.00 US
25,000 Won	Emblem of Republic of Korea, Taeguk surrounded bu five roses of Sharon.	D.H. Oh and D.K. Min	Fan Dance, Korean Folk Dance	K.H. Kim and S.A. Lee	Milled	August 1987	Proof and Brilliant Uncirculated	79,355 (Pr), 21,863 (BU)	(Pr) $350.00 US, (BU) $300.00 US
10,000 Won	Emblem of Republic of Korea, Taeguk surrounded bu five roses of Sharon.	D.H. Oh and D.K. Min	Volleyball, introduced in Korea in 1916	D.K. Min	Milled	August 1987	Proof and Brilliant Uncirculated	204,235 (Pr), 54,618 (BU)	(Pr) $37.50 US, (BU) $30.00 US
10,000 Won	Emblem of Republic of Korea, Taeguk surrounded bu five roses of Sharon.	D.H. Oh and D.K. Min	Archer	Y.S. Lee and D.K. Min	Milled	August 1987	Proof and Brilliant Uncirculated	183,985 (Pr), 49,203 (BU)	(Pr) $37.50 US, (BU) $30.00 US
5,000 Won	Emblem of Republic of Korea, Taeguk surrounded bu five roses of Sharon.	D.H. Oh and D.K. Min	Main stadium	C.S. Park	Milled	August 1987	Proof and Brilliant Uncirculated	188,118 (Pr), 73,521 (BU)	(Pr) $22.50 US, (BU) $15.00 US
5,000 Won	Emblem of Republic of Korea, Taeguk surrounded bu five roses of Sharon.	D.H. Oh and D.K. Min	Shuttlecock, Cheki-kicking and Chegi Cha Ki	D.H. Oh	Milled	August 1987	Proof and Brilliant Uncirculated	168,461 (Pr), 65,838 (BU)	(Pr) $22.50 US, (BU) $15.00 US
2,000 Won	Emblem of Republic of Korea, Taeguk surrounded bu five roses of Sharon.	D.H. Oh and D.K. Min	Judo	D.H. Oh	Milled	August 1987	Proof and Brilliant Uncirculated	137,561 (Pr), 322,508 (BU)	(Pr) $16.50 US, (BU) $12.00 US
1,000 Won	Emblem of Republic of Korea, Taeguk surrounded bu five roses of Sharon.	D.H. Oh and D.K. Min	Tennis	D.H. Oh	Milled	1987	Proof and Brilliant Uncirculated	139,650 (Pr), 391,340 (BU)	(Pr) $10.00 US, (BU) $7.00 US

=== Series Three ===
Denomination	Reverse Design	Artist	Obverse Design	Artist	Edge	Date of Issue	Finish	Mintage	Issue Price
50,000 Won	Emblem of Republic of Korea, Taeguk surrounded bu five roses of Sharon.	D.H. Oh and D.K. Min	Ceramic Horse and Rider, a relic of the Shilla Epoch	Y.S. Lee	Milled	March 1988	Proof	30,000	$750.00 US
25,000 Won	Emblem of Republic of Korea, Taeguk surrounded bu five roses of Sharon.	D.H. Oh and D.K. Min	Kite Flying	D.H. Oh	Milled	March 1988	Proof and Brilliant Uncirculated	76,678 (Pr), 21,126 (BU)	(Pr) $350.00 US, (BU) $300.00 US
10,000 Won	Emblem of Republic of Korea, Taeguk surrounded bu five roses of Sharon.	D.H. Oh and D.K. Min	Equestrian	D.H. Oh and D.K. Min	Milled	March 1988	Proof and Brilliant Uncirculated	77,555 (Pr), 20,740 (BU)	(Pr) $37.50 US, (BU) $30.00 US
10,000 Won	Emblem of Republic of Korea, Taeguk surrounded bu five roses of Sharon.	D.H. Oh and D.K. Min	Rhythmic Gymnastics	D.K. Min	Milled	March 1988	Proof and Brilliant Uncirculated	76,898 (Pr), 20,564 (BU)	(Pr) $37.50 US, (BU) $30.00 US
5,000 Won	Emblem of Republic of Korea, Taeguk surrounded bu five roses of Sharon.	D.H. Oh and D.K. Min	Taekwondo	D.H. Oh	Milled	March 1988	Proof and Brilliant Uncirculated	156,180 (Pr), 61,039 (BU)	(Pr) $22.50 US, (BU) $15.00 US
5,000 Won	Emblem of Republic of Korea, Taeguk surrounded bu five roses of Sharon.	D.H. Oh and D.K. Min	Swinging, a traditional competition to establish who can swing highest during the Tan O Festival	D.H. Oh	Milled	March 1988	Proof and Brilliant Uncirculated	147,227 (Pr), 57,540 (BU)	(Pr) $22.50 US, (BU) $15.00 US
2,000 Won	Emblem of Republic of Korea, Taeguk surrounded bu five roses of Sharon.	D.H. Oh and D.K. Min	Wrestling	Y.S. Lee and K.H. Kim	Milled	March 1988	Proof and Brilliant Uncirculated	139,005 (Pr), 325,894 (BU)	(Pr) $16.50 US, (BU) $12.00 US
1,000 Won	Emblem of Republic of Korea, Taeguk surrounded bu five roses of Sharon.	D.H. Oh and D.K. Min	Handball	Y.S. Lee and K.H. Kim	Milled	March 1988	Proof and Brilliant Uncirculated	137,681 (Pr), 385,822 (BU)	(Pr) $10.00 US, (BU) $7.00 US

=== Series Four ===
Denomination	Reverse Design	Artist	Obverse Design	Artist	Edge	Date of Issue	Finish	Mintage	Issue Price
50,000 Won	Emblem of Republic of Korea, Taeguk surrounded bu five roses of Sharon.	D.H. Oh and D.K. Min	Dabotap Pagoda, built during the 8th Century and located in the garden of a Buddhist temple in Kyung Joo	K.H. Kim	Milled	September 1988	Proof	30,000	$750.00 US
25,000 Won	Emblem of Republic of Korea, Taeguk surrounded bu five roses of Sharon.	D.H. Oh and D.K. Min	Seesaw	D.H. Oh	Milled	September 1988	Proof and Brilliant Uncirculated	63,050 (Pr), 17,371 (BU)	(Pr) $350.00 US, (BU) $300.00 US
10,000 Won	Emblem of Republic of Korea, Taeguk surrounded bu five roses of Sharon.	D.H. Oh and D.K. Min	Football (Soccer)	D.K. Min	Milled	September 1988	Proof and Brilliant Uncirculated	63,906 (Pr), 17,090 (BU)	(Pr) $37.50 US, (BU) $30.00 US
10,000 Won	Emblem of Republic of Korea, Taeguk surrounded bu five roses of Sharon.	D.H. Oh and D.K. Min	Cycling	Y.S. Lee and D.H. Oh	Milled	September 1988	Proof and Brilliant Uncirculated	67,956 (Pr), 18,173 (BU)	(Pr) $37.50 US, (BU) $30.00 US
5,000 Won	Emblem of Republic of Korea, Taeguk surrounded bu five roses of Sharon.	D.H. Oh and D.K. Min	Top Spinning	Y.S. Lee and K.H. Kim	Milled	September 1988	Proof and Brilliant Uncirculated	131,394 (Pr), 51,351 (BU)	(Pr) $22.50 US, (BU) $15.00 US
5,000 Won	Emblem of Republic of Korea, Taeguk surrounded bu five roses of Sharon.	D.H. Oh and D.K. Min	Ssirum – Korean wrestling	K.H. Kim and D.H. Oh	Milled	September 1988	Proof and Brilliant Uncirculated	132,514 (Pr), 51,789 (BU)	(Pr) $22.50 US, (BU) $15.00 US
2,000 Won	Emblem of Republic of Korea, Taeguk surrounded bu five roses of Sharon.	D.H. Oh and D.K. Min	Weightlifting	D.H. Oh	Milled	September 1988	Proof and Brilliant Uncirculated	137,793 (Pr), 323,053 (BU)	(Pr) $16.50 US, (BU) $12.00 US
1,000 Won	Emblem of Republic of Korea, Taeguk surrounded bu five roses of Sharon.	D.H. Oh and D.K. Min	Table Tennis	D.H. Oh	Milled	September 1988	Proof and Brilliant Uncirculated	136,501 (Pr), 382,514 (BU)	(Pr) $10.00 US, (BU) $7.00 US

== 1992 Barcelona Games ==
=== Dimensions ===
Denomination	Diameter	Weight	Thickness	Composition	Mint Mark
25 Pesetas	19.50 mm with a hole in center	4.25 grams	2.11 mm	88.4% copper, 5% nickel, 5% aluminum, 1% iron, 0.6% magnesium	M with crown on top
2000 Pesetas	40 mm	27 grams	2.45 mm	925 silver and 75 copper	M with crown on top
10,000 Pesetas	19 mm	3.37 grams	0.75 mm	999 gold	M with crown on top
20,000 Pesetas	23 mm	6.75 grams	1.02 mm	999 gold	M with crown on top
80,000 Pesetas	38 mm	27 grams	1.45 mm	999 gold	M with crown on top

=== 25 Pesetas ===
Specifications

Reverse Design	Artist	Obverse Design	Artist	Edge	Date of Issue	Mintage
Olympic emblem of Barcelona	Mint engravers	A Discus thrower, word ESPANA and year 1990	Mint engravers	Plain	1990	35,052,000
A high jumper, Olympic emblem of Barcelona	Mint engravers	Effigy of King Juan Carlos I, word ESPANA and year 1990	Mint engravers	Plain	1990	30,478,000

=== Spanish Art ===
- Series One

Denomination	Reverse Design	Artist	Obverse Design	Artist	Edge	Date of Issue	Finish	Mintage	Issue Price
80,000 Pesetas	Cosmic Athlete from Salvador Dalí painting	Mint engravers (from Dalí's painting)	Portrait of the Royal Family	Mint engravers	Proof : milled, Fleur de coins : alternately plain and milled	1990	Proof, Fleur de coins	30,000 (Pr), 25,000 (Fl)	130,000 Pesetas (Pr), 115,000 Pesetas (Fl)
20,000 Pesetas	Sagrada Familia (Gaudi's Holy Family Cathedral)	Mint engravers	Portrait of King Don Juan Carlos I	Mint engravers	Proof : milled, Fleur de coins : alternately plain and milled	1990	Proof, Fleur de coins	37,000 (Pr), 42,000 (Fl)	33,000 Pesetas (Pr), 30,000 Pesetas (Fl)

- Series Two

Denomination	Reverse Design	Artist	Obverse Design	Edge	Date of Issue	Finish	Mintage	Issue Price	
80,000 Pesetas	Prince Balthasar Carlos on horseback	Mint engravers	Portrait of the Royal Family	Mint engravers	Proof : milled, Fleur de coins : alternately plain and milled	January 25, 1991	Proof, Fleur de coins	8,000 (Pr), 8,000 (Fl)	130,000 Pesetas (Pr), 115,000 Pesetas (Fl)
20,000 Pesetas	Ruins of Catalan city, Empúries	Mint engravers	Portrait of King Don Juan Carlos I	Mint engravers	Proof : milled, Fleur de coins : alternately plain and milled	January 25, 1991	Proof, Fleur de coins	35,000 (Pr), 15,000 (Fl)	33,000 Pesetas (Pr), 30,000 Pesetas (Fl)

=== Olympic Spirit ===
- Series One

Denomination	Reverse Design	Artist	Obverse Design	Artist	Edge	Date of Issue	Finish	Mintage	Issue Price
10,000 Pesetas	Field Hockey	Mint engravers	Portrait of Don Felipe, Prince of Asturias	Mint engravers	Proof : milled, Fleur de coins : alternately plain and milled	1990	Proof, Fleur de coins	45,000 (Pr), 80,000 (Fl)	19,000 Pesetas (Pr), 16,000 Pesetas (Fl)
2,000 Pesetas	Olympic Emblem of Barcelona	Mint engravers	Effigies of King Don Juan Carlos I and Don Felipe, Prince of Asturias	Mint engravers	Proof : milled, Fleur de coins : alternately plain and milled	1990	Proof, Fleur de coins	235,000 (Pr), 135,000 (Fl)	4,000 Pesetas (Pr), 3,400 Pesetas (Fl)
2,000 Pesetas	Archer (from pre-historic painting)	Mint engravers (from Levantine art)	Proof : milled, Fleur de coins : alternately plain and milled	Mint engravers	Effigies of King Don Juan Carlos I and Don Felipe, Prince of Asturias	1990	Proof, Fleur de coins	235,000 (Pr), 135,000 (Fl)	4,000 Pesetas (Pr), 3,400 Pesetas (Fl)
2,000 Pesetas	Football (Soccer)	Mint engravers	Effigies of King Don Juan Carlos I and Don Felipe, Prince of Asturias	Mint engravers	Proof : milled, Fleur de coins : alternately plain and milled	1990	Proof, Fleur de coins	235,000 (Pr), 135,000 (Fl)	4,000 Pesetas (Pr), 3,400 Pesetas (Fl)

- Series Two

Denomination	Reverse Design	Artist	Obverse Design	Artist	Edge	Date of Issue	Finish	Mintage	Issue Price
10,000 Pesetas	A Pictogram depicting gymnastics	Mint engravers	Portrait of Don Felipe, Prince of Asturias	Mint engravers	Proof : milled, Fleur de coins : alternately plain and milled	January 25, 1991	Proof, Fleur de coins	50,000 (Pr), 20,000 (Fl)	19,000 Pesetas (Pr), 16,000 Pesetas (Fl)
2,000 Pesetas	A Greek runner	Mint engravers	Effigies of King Don Juan Carlos I and Don Felipe, Prince of Asturias	Mint engravers	Proof : milled, Fleur de coins : alternately plain and milled	January 25, 1991	Proof, Fleur de coins	180,000 (Pr), 80,000 (Fl)	4,000 Pesetas (Pr), 3,400 Pesetas (Fl)
2,000 Pesetas	Rowing (curved river boat and six oarsmen and one helmsman)	Mint engravers	Effigies of King Don Juan Carlos I and Don Felipe, Prince of Asturias	Mint engravers	Proof : milled, Fleur de coins : alternately plain and milled	January 25, 1991	Proof, Fleur de coins	180,000 (Pr), 80,000 (Fl)	4,000 Pesetas (Pr), 3,400 Pesetas (Fl)
2,000 Pesetas	Basketball	Mint engravers	Effigies of King Don Juan Carlos I and Don Felipe, Prince of Asturias	Mint engravers	Proof : milled, Fleur de coins : alternately plain and milled	January 25, 1991	Proof, Fleur de coins	180,000 (Pr), 80,000 (Fl)	4,000 Pesetas (Pr), 3,400 Pesetas (Fl)

=== Spanish Tradition ===
- Series One

Denomination	Reverse Design	Artist	Obverse Design	Artist	Edge	Date of Issue	Finish	Mintage	Issue Price
2,000 Pesetas	Els Castellers (a human pyramid, an old Catalan tradition)	Mint engravers	Effigies of King Don Juan Carlos I and Don Felipe, Prince of Asturias	Mint engravers	Proof : milled, Fleur de coins : alternately plain and milled	1990	Proof, Fleur de coins	235,000 (Pr), 135,000 (Fl)	4,000 Pesetas (Pr), 3,400 Pesetas (Fl)

- Series Two

Denomination	Reverse Design	Artist	Obverse Design	Artist	Edge	Date of Issue	Finish	Mintage	Issue Price
2,000 Pesetas	Jai alai, a Basque game	Mint engravers	Effigies of King Don Juan Carlos I and Don Felipe, Prince of Asturias	Mint engravers	Proof : milled, Fleur de coins : alternately plain and milled	January 25, 1991	Proof, Fleur de coins	180,000 (Pr), 80,000 (Fl)	4,000 Pesetas (Pr), 3,400 Pesetas (Fl)

== 1996 Atlanta Games ==
=== Half Dollar ===
Year	Denomination	Theme	Mintage	US Mint Facility	Engraver	Obverse Design	Designer	Reverse Design
1995	Half Dollar	Centennial Olympics (Baseball)	Proof 170,114 Unc 171,019	San Francisco, CA (Proof/Uncirculated)	Edgar Z. Steever	Men's baseball.	T. James Ferrell	The Atlanta Committee for the Olympic Games mark superimposed over a globe.
1995	Half Dollar	Centennial Olympics (Basketball)	Proof 118,556 Unc 164,624	San Francisco, CA (Proof/Uncirculated)	Clint Hansen	Men's basketball.	T. James Ferrell	The Atlanta Committee for the Olympic Games mark superimposed over a globe.
1996	Half Dollar	Centennial Olympics (Swimming)	Proof 114,554 Unc 49,571	San Francisco, CA (Proof/Uncirculated)		Women's Swimming		
1996	Half Dollar	Centennial Olympics (Soccer)	Proof 122,456 Unc 52,871	San Francisco, CA (Proof/Uncirculated)		Woman's Soccer		

=== One Dollar ===
Year	Denomination	Theme	Mintage	US Mint Facility	Engraver	Obverse Design	Designer	Reverse Design
1995	One Dollar	Centennial Olympics (Cycling)	Proof 120,444 Unc 19,671	West Point, NY and Philadelphia, PA (Proof/Uncirculated)	John Mercanti	Men cycling.	William Krawczewicz	Clasped hands symbolizing brotherhood and team spirit.
1995	One Dollar	Centennial Olympics (Track & Field)	Proof 137,004 Unc 24,819	Philadelphia, PA (Proof) Denver, CO (Uncirculated)	John Mercanti	Men's track and field competition.	William Krawczewicz	Clasped hands symbolizing brotherhood and team spirit.
1995	One Dollar	Centennial Olympics (Paralympics)	Proof 84,808 Unc 14,513	Philadelphia, PA (Proof) Denver, CO (Uncirculated)	James Sharpe	Blind tethered runner and the Paralympic mark.	William Krawczewicz	Clasped hands symbolizing brotherhood and team spirit.
1995	One Dollar	Centennial Olympics (Gymnastics)	Proof 182,742 Unc 42,518	Philadelphia, PA (Proof) Denver, CO (Uncirculated)	James Sharpe	Men's gymnastics.	William Krawczewicz	Clasped hands symbolizing brotherhood and team spirit.
1996	One Dollar	Centennial Olympics (paralympics)	Proof 84,808 Unc 14,513	West Point, NY and Philadelphia, PA (Proof/Uncirculated)	John Mercanti	Wheelchair Athlete	William Krawczewicz	Clasped hands symbolizing brotherhood and team spirit.
1996	One Dollar	Centennial Olympics (Tennis)	Proof 120,444 Unc 19,671	West Point, NY and Philadelphia, PA (Proof/Uncirculated)	John Mercanti	woman playing tennis	William Krawczewicz	Clasped hands symbolizing brotherhood and team spirit.

=== Five Dollars ===
Year	Denomination	Theme	Mintage	US Mint Facility	Engraver	Obverse Design	Designer	Reverse Design
1995	Five Dollars (Gold)	Centennial Olympics (Torch Runner)	175,000	West Point, NY (Proof/Uncirculated)	Frank Gasparro	Runner carrying torch.	Frank Gasparro	Side view of a bald eagle with a banner in its beak.
1995	Five Dollars (Gold)	Centennial Olympics (Stadium)	175,000	West Point, NY (Proof/Uncirculated)	Marcel Jovine	Picture of the Olympic Stadium.	Frank Gasparro	Side view of a bald eagle with a banner in its beak.
1996	Five Dollars (Gold)	Centennial Olympics (Cauldron)	300,000	West Point, NY (Proof/Uncirculated)	Frank Gasparro	The lighting of the Olympic flame.	William Krawczewicz	The Atlanta Committee for the Olympic Games mark, encompassed by laurel leaves.
1996	Five Dollars (Gold)	Centennial Olympics (Flag Bearer)	300,000	West Point, NY (Proof/Uncirculated)	Patricia L. Verani	Athlete bearing a flag and a following crowd.	William Krawczewicz	The Atlanta Committee for the Olympic Games mark, encompassed by laurel leaves.

== Centennial Olympic Coin Program, 1992-1996 ==
As 1996 marked the centennial of the first modern Olympic games held in Athens, a series of five gold and ten silver coins were struck by five countries: Canada, Australia, France. Austria, and Greece. The concept for the program was first discussed in 1986 and 1987. The Royal Canadian Mint held the view that the Centennial of the modern Olympic Games should be commemorated. The International Olympic Committee was approached on the idea and five Mints were invited to participate in the program. This marked the first time that the International Olympic Committee participated in an international commemorative coin program.

Year of Issue	Mint	Theme
1992	Royal Canadian Mint, Canada	Citius, altius, fortius
1993	Royal Australian Mint, Australia	Participation, Friendship, Fair Play
1994	Monnaie de Paris, France	The First Congress
1995	Münze Österreich, Austria	Art, Music, Sport
1996	Banknote Printing Works, The Bank of Greece	The I Olympic Games
