= Canadian Gold Maple Leaf =

Gold bullion coin of Canada

- Canada
- Value: 50.00 CAD (face value)
- Mass: 31.11 g (1.00 troy oz)
- Diameter: 30 mm (1.181 in)
- Edge: Reeded
- Composition: Gold (99.99% Au)
- Years of minting: 1979–present

Obverse
- Design: Monarch of Canada

Reverse
- Design: Maple Leaf
- Design date: 1979 (2015)

The Canadian Gold Maple Leaf (GML; French: Feuille d'érable en or canadienne) is a gold bullion coin that is issued annually by the Government of Canada. It is produced by the Royal Canadian Mint.

The Gold Maple Leaf is legal tender with a face value of 50 Canadian dollars. The market value of the metal varies, depending on the spot price of gold. Having a .9999 millesimal fineness (24 karats), in some cases .99999, the coin is among the purest official bullion coins worldwide. The standard version has a weight of minimum 1 troy ounce (31.1 grams). Other sizes and denominations include: 1 gram, 1/25 oz. ($0.50), 1/20 oz. ($1), 1/10 oz. ($5), 1/4 oz. ($10) and 1/2 oz. ($20).

== History ==
The coin was introduced in 1979. At the time the only competing bullion coins being minted were the Krugerrand (which was not widely available because of the economic boycott of apartheid-era South Africa) and the Austrian 100 Corona. Coins minted between 1979 and 1982 have a fineness of .999.

On 3 May 2007, the Royal Canadian Mint unveiled a Gold Maple Leaf coin with a nominal face value of $1 million and a metal value of over $3.5 million, referred to as a Big Maple Leaf. It measures 50 cm in diameter by 3 cm thick and has a mass of 100 kg, with a purity of 99.999%. On 26 March 2017, one of the six pieces was stolen from the Berlin Bode Museum; it has not been found as of 2021. It is assumed that it has been melted down for the gold.

The Gold Maple Leaf's obverse displays the profile of the Monarch of Canada while the reverse displays a maple leaf. In 2013 and 2015, new security features were introduced. In 2013, a laser-micro-engraved textured maple leaf was added on a small area of the reverse (Maple Leaf) side of the coin. In the centre of this mark is the numeral denoting the coin's year of issue, which is only visible under magnification. In 2015, the radial lines on the coin's background on both sides of the coin were added.

== Specifications ==
| Years | Denominations | Purity | Obverse | Reverse |
|---|---|---|---|---|
| 1979–1982 | 1 oz. | .999 | Portrait of Queen Elizabeth II aged 39 facing right | Maple leaf on a flat surface |
| November 1982 – 1985 | 1 oz., 1/4 oz., 1/10 oz. | .9999 | Portrait of Queen Elizabeth II aged 39 facing right | Maple leaf on a flat surface |
| 1986–1989 | 1 oz., 1/2 oz., 1/4 oz., 1/10 oz. | .9999 | Portrait of Queen Elizabeth II aged 39 facing right | Maple leaf on a flat surface |
| 1990–1992 | 1 oz., 1/2 oz., 1/4 oz., 1/10 oz. | .9999 | Portrait of Queen Elizabeth II aged 64 facing right | Maple leaf on a flat surface |
| 1993 | 1 oz., 1/2 oz., 1/4 oz., 1/10 oz., 1/20 oz. | .9999 | Portrait of Queen Elizabeth II aged 64 facing right | Maple leaf on a flat surface |
| 1994 | 1 oz., 1/2 oz., 1/4 oz., 1/10 oz., 1/15 oz., 1/20 oz. | .9999 | Portrait of Queen Elizabeth II aged 64 facing right | Maple leaf on a flat surface |
| 1995–2004 | 1 oz., 1/2 oz., 1/4 oz., 1/10 oz., 1/20 oz. | .9999 | Portrait of Queen Elizabeth II aged 64 facing right | Maple leaf on a flat surface |
| 2005–2012 | 1 oz., 1/2 oz., 1/4 oz., 1/10 oz., 1/20 oz. | .9999 | Portrait of Queen Elizabeth II aged 79 facing right | Maple leaf on a flat surface |
| 2013 | 1 oz., 1/2 oz., 1/4 oz., 1/10 oz., 1/20 oz. | .9999 | Portrait of Queen Elizabeth II aged 79 facing right | Maple leaf on a flat surface and micro-engraved maple leaf hologram |
| 2014 | 1 oz., 1/2 oz., 1/4 oz., 1/10 oz., 1/20 oz., 1 gram. | .9999 | Portrait of Queen Elizabeth II aged 79 facing right | Maple leaf on a flat surface and micro-engraved maple leaf hologram |
| 2015–2023 | 1 oz., 1/2 oz., 1/4 oz., 1/10 oz., 1/20 oz., 1 gram. | .9999 | Portrait of Queen Elizabeth II aged 79 facing right | Maple leaf with radial lines and micro-engraved maple leaf hologram |
| 2024–Present | 1 oz., 1/2 oz., 1/4 oz., 1/10 oz., 1/20 oz., 1 gram. | .9999 | Portrait of King Charles III facing left | Maple leaf with radial lines and micro-engraved maple leaf hologram |

For .99999 ("Five Nines") Pure Gold Maple Leafs, see Special issues below.

The .9999 1982 Gold Maple Leafs began minting in November. Thus, most of the 1982 Gold Maple Leafs are .999 fine.

Some dealers have complained about the production quality of the Gold Maples.

== Special issues ==
=== 99.999% Gold Maple Leaf ===
The gold Maple Leaf coin was .999 pure until 1982, when its purity was raised to .9999. Some coins are issued at a purity of .99999; this standard does not replace the Mint's .9999 Gold Maple Leaf coins, but is instead reserved for special editions. In 1999, the mint celebrated twenty years of the $100 Maple Leaf coin by issuing coins with a hologram, struck directly onto the coin's surface, rather than as a separate step.

| Year | Theme | Artist | Mintage | Issue Price | Special Notes | Image |
|---|---|---|---|---|---|---|
| 2005 | Fifty Dollar Coin | N/A | at first 600 left 396 | N/A | 1 troy ounce coin; .99999 oz pure gold - experimental issue | |
| 2007 | Two Hundred Dollar Coin | Stanley Witten | 500 | $1,899.95 | test bullion coin, 1 troy ounce coin; .99999 oz pure gold, privy t/e - test coin, comes encapsulated and presented in a maroon flock-lined clamshell case, available to collectors who enter draw-to-buy | |
| 2007 | Two Hundred Dollar Coin | Stanley Witten | 30,848 | N/A | 1 troy ounce coin; .99999 oz pure gold, packaged in assay card | |
| 2007 | One Million Dollar Coin | Stanley Witten | 5 | N/A | Nicknamed the Big Maple Leaf, this coin has a mass of 100 kg (which is 3,215 troy ounces). A set of five coins were minted; one was stolen from Berlin's Bode Museum on March 27, 2017. | |
| 2008 | Two Hundred Dollar Coin | | 1,700 | $1,394.64 | Special Limited Edition First Strike | |
| 2008 | Two Hundred Dollar Coin | | 27,476 | N/A | 1 troy ounce coin; .99999 oz pure gold, packaged in assay card | |
| 2009 | Two Hundred Dollar Coin | Stanley Witten | 13,765 | N/A | 1 troy ounce coin; .99999 oz pure gold, packaged in assay card | |
| 2011 | Two Hundred Dollar Coin | Ago Aarand | 8,408 | N/A | Canadian Mountie Maple Leaf; 1 troy ounce coin; .99999 fine gold 1 oz or pur, packaged in assay card | |
| 2012 | Two Hundred Dollar Coin | Stanley Witten | N/A | N/A | 1 troy ounce coin; .99999 fine gold 1 oz or pur, the picture of the maple leaf on the reverse is the same as on the coin from 2007, but moved right nearly 90 degrees - as on the 100 kg coin, packaged in assay card | |
| 2012 | Five Hundred Dollar Coin | | | 5 ounce 9999 gold maple leaf forever, mintage of 200 | | |
| 2014 | Two Hundred Dollar Coin | Pierre Leduc | N/A | N/A | 1 troy ounce coin; .99999 fine gold 1 oz or pur, Gold Howling Wolf, packaged in assay card | |
| 2014 | Two Hundred Dollar Coin | Pierre Leduc | 2,000 | CAD2,799.95 | 1 troy ounce coin; .99999 fine gold 1 oz or pur, Gold Howling Wolf, proof version comes encapsulated and presented in a maroon flock-lined clamshell case | |
| 2015 | Two Hundred Dollar Coin | Pierre Leduc | N/A | N/A | 1 troy ounce coin; .99999 fine gold 1 oz or pur, Gold Growling Cougar, packaged in assay card | |
| 2015 | Two Hundred Dollar Coin | Pierre Leduc | 250 | CAD2,799.95 | 1 troy ounce coin; .99999 fine gold 1 oz or pur, Gold Growling Cougar, proof version comes encapsulated and presented in a maroon flock-lined clamshell case | |
| 2016 | Two Hundred Dollar Coin | Pierre Leduc | N/A | N/A | 1 troy ounce coin; .99999 fine gold 1 oz or pur, Gold Roaring Grizzly, third and last of series, packaged in assay card | |
| 2016 | Two Hundred Dollar Coin | Pierre Leduc | 250 | CAD2,799.95 | 1 troy ounce coin; .99999 fine gold 1 oz or pur, Gold Roaring Grizzly, proof version comes encapsulated and presented in a maroon flock-lined clamshell case | |

=== Coloured Gold Maple Leaf ===
| Year | Theme | Artist | Mintage | Issue Price | Special Notes |
|---|---|---|---|---|---|
| 1999 | 20th Anniversary of the GML - fractional 5 coins | Walter Ott, RCM Engravers | 13,025 | N/A | These are the first coloured coins that the Royal Canadian Mint has ever produced |
| 2010 | Gold Maple Leaf Vancouver Olympics 3 x 31.15 g (1 oz) | Susanna Blunt | 200 | N/A | These are 3 coins of olympic series, but with red painted maple leafs on reverse - all in the wooden box |

=== Hologram Gold Maple Leaf ===
| Year | Theme | Artist | Mintage | Issue Price | Special Notes |
|---|---|---|---|---|---|
| 1999 | $1, $5, $10, $20, $50 GML Hologram Set | Walter Ott, RCM Engravers | 500 | $1,995 | First Coins for RCM to feature a hologram |
| 2001 | $1, $5, $10, $20, $50 GML Hologram Set | Walter Ott, RCM Engravers | 600 | $1,995 | The only difference was the issue date on the coin; 2001 instead of former 1999 |
| 2001 | $10 GML Hologram | Walter Ott, RCM Engravers | 14,614 | $195 | 1/4-oz |
| 2009 | $1, $5, $10, $50 Hologram Set, 30th Anniversary of Gold Maple Leaf | N/A | 750 | N/A | 1/20 oz, 1/10 oz, 1/4 oz, 1 oz - all packaged in a wooden box |

=== Olympic Maple Leaf ===
The Royal Canadian Mint and the International Olympic Committee reached an agreement on Olympic Gold and Silver Maple Leaf coins on August 3, 2007, and the agreement allowed the RCM to strike bullion coins with the emblems of the 2010 Winter Olympics and Paralympics. The issue consists of two coins – one Gold Maple Leaf coin and a Canadian Silver Maple Leaf coin; both coins feature the date of 2008. The RCM sold Olympic coins through all of its major business lines – bullion, circulation and numismatics.

=== Individual releases ===
| Year | Theme | Artist | Mintage | Issue price | Comment |
|---|---|---|---|---|---|
| 1989 | 10th Anniversary Coin | Walter Ott | 6,817 | Bullion Value | The only proof version, packaged in a wooden box separately or together with 1/2, 1/4 and 1/10 oz coins |
| 1997 | 125th Anniversary of the RCMP | Ago Aarand | 12,913 | US$310 | Guaranteed value of US$310, until January 1, 2000 |
| 1999 | 20th Anniversary Coin | N/A | N/A | Bullion value | privy mark "20 years ans" on the reverse |
| 2004 | 25th Anniversary of Gold Maple Leaf | Walter Ott | 10,000 | Bullion value | Introduced at ANA World's Fair of Money in Pittsburgh |
| 2014 | Bullion Replica | N/A | 2,000 | CAD2,699.95 | Specimen version of Maple Leaf comes encapsulated and presented in a maroon flock-lined clamshell case and accompanied by a serialized certificate |
| 2015 | 1/10 oz Gold Maple Theory of Relativity Privy | N/A | N/A | N/A | Frosted background version of Maple Leaf 1/10 oz with privy mark E = mc^{2} on the left |
| 2015 | Allied Gold/L'or des alliés | Joel Kimmel | 1,500 | $649.95 | 1/4 oz. Flight of the Norwegian National Treasury (part of Operation Fish, that brought British, French and Norwegian gold to Canada). The maple leaf of Canada is impaled with a Norwegian maple leaf. |

=== Privy-marked Gold Maple Leaf ===
| Year | Privy Mark | Denomination | Size | Mintage | Issue price | Special Notes |
|---|---|---|---|---|---|---|
| 1997 | Family | Five Dollars | 1/10 oz | 100,730 | | Made for Dillon Gage |
| 1998 | Eagles | Five Dollars | 1/10 oz | 51,440 | | Made for Dillon Gage |
| 2000 | Expo Hanover | Ten Dollars | 1/4-oz | 1,000 | | N/A |
| 2001 | Basle Coin Fair | Ten Dollars | 1/4-oz | 750 | | N/A |
| 2001 | Viking | 50, 20, 10, 5, 1 | 1 oz, 1/2-oz, 1/4-oz, 1/10-oz, 1/20-oz | 850 | | Issued as a five coin set |
| 2005 | Liberation | Ten Dollars | 1/4 oz | 500 | | Made for Royal Dutch Mint |
| 2024 | First Strikes: Polar Bear Privy Mark | Five Dollars | 1/10 oz | 5,000 | 359.95 CAD | First gold bullion strikes featuring His Majesty King Charles III, sold directly from the Royal Canadian Mint. Encapsulated in a premium card. |

=== Maple Leaf "Privy M7" ===
| Year | Denomination | Size | Mintage | Special Notes |
|---|---|---|---|---|
| 2004 | Ten Dollars | 1/4-oz | 10 | This is a test coin struck in a proof or specimen finish. Distributed privately in Europe. |
| 2005 | Ten Dollars | 1/4-oz | 600 (other source: 1,300?) | reverse background of the coin is a "bricks" motive, instead of standard parallel lines bullion finishing as on the obverse; M7 privy mark is on the standard right position |
| 2006 | Ten Dollars | 1/4-oz | 1,093 (other source: 1,100?) | reverse upper half of the background of the coin has standard parallel lines bullion finishing as on the obverse, and the lower half has frosted finishing; M7 privy mark is on the standard right position |
| 2007 | Ten Dollars | 1/4-oz | 1,000 - other source | reverse upper half of the background of the coin is frosted, lower half - with curved "sun rays" motive, partly frosted on the parallel standard bullion finishing; on the obverse, standard parallel lines bullion finishing; M7 privy mark is on the standard right position |

=== Other fractional Gold Maple Leaf ===
| Year | Description | Denomination | Size | Mintage | Issue Price | Special Notes |
|---|---|---|---|---|---|---|
| 2011 | Maple Leaf variations - standard leaf | 50, 10, 5, 1 | 1 oz, 1/4 oz, 1/10 oz, 1/20 oz | 750 | CAD3,739.95 | Issued as a four coin set in a wooden box plus a gold plated silver medallion - A centennial of world-class refining, all coins double dated 1911–2011, additionally on 1 oz coin privy mark "100 years/ans" |
| 2012 | Maple Leaf variations - three leaves | 50, 20, 10, 5, 1 | 1 oz, 1/2 oz, 1/4 oz, 1/10 oz, 1/20 oz | 750 | CAD3,999.95 | Issued as a five coin set in a wooden box - 5th Anniversary of the Million Dollar Coin |
| 2013 | Maple Leaf variations - two leaves | 50, 10, 5, 1 | 1 oz, 1/4 oz, 1/10 oz, 1/20 oz | 600 | CAD3,899.95 | Issued as a four coin set in a wooden box - 25th Anniversary Fractional Set |
| 2014 | Maple Leaf variations - three leaves | 50, 10, 5, 1 | 1 oz, 1/4 oz, 1/10 oz, 1/20 oz | 600 | CAD3,999.95 | Issued as a four coin set in a wooden box |
| 2015 | Maple Leaf variations - one leaf | 50, 10, 5, 1 | 1 oz, 1/4 oz, 1/10 oz, 1/20 oz | 600 | CAD3,999.95 | Issued as a four coin set in a wooden box, every 1 oz coin is numbered, different maple leaf on every coin |
| 2016 | Maple Leaf variations - one leaf with crown and letters | 50, 10, 5, 1 | 1 oz, 1/4 oz, 1/10 oz, 1/20 oz | 600 | CAD3,999.95 | Issued as a four coin set in a wooden box, every 1 oz coin is numbered, obverse with crowned queen |

=== Bimetallic Maple Leaf ===
As a way of commemorating 25 years as an industry leader in bullion coins, the Royal Canadian Mint created a unique six-coin set. mint.ca It was a new bimetallic maple leaf, set in bullion finish (a brilliant relief against a parallel lined background). The six-coin set was the first to include the 1/25 oz Maple Leaf denomination. Each coin included a double-date of 1979–2004, and the 1 oz coin featured a commemorative privy mark. All coins were packaged in a black leather presentation case with a black velour insert, along with a certificate of authenticity. It was issued at a price of $2,495.95 and with a mintage of 839 sets.

Coin Specifications
| Year | Theme | Face Value | Size | Composition | | Au Weight | Ag Weight (Total - Au) | Total Weight of the coin | Total Diameter |
| Year | Theme | Face Value | Size | Ring | Core | Au Weight | Ag Weight (Total - Au) | Total Weight of the coin | Total Diameter |
|---|---|---|---|---|---|---|---|---|---|
| 2004 | 25th Anniversary, Gold Maple Leaf | | | | | | | | |
| 2004 | 25th Anniversary, Gold Maple Leaf | $0.5 | 1/25 oz | .9999 silver | .9999 gold | 1.27 | 0.769 | 2.039 | 16 |
| 2004 | 25th Anniversary, Gold Maple Leaf | $1 | 1/20 oz | .9999 silver | .9999 gold | 1.581 | 0.791 | 2.372 | 18.03 |
| 2004 | 25th Anniversary, Gold Maple Leaf | $5 | 1/10 oz | .9999 silver | .9999 gold | 3.136 | 1.33 | 4.466 | 20 |
| 2004 | 25th Anniversary, Gold Maple Leaf | $10 | 1/4 oz | .9999 silver | .9999 gold | 7.802 | 3.098 | 10.9 | 25 |
| 2004 | 25th Anniversary, Gold Maple Leaf | $20 | 1/2 oz | .9999 silver | .9999 gold | 15.589 | 4.486 | 20.075 | 30 |
| 2004 | 25th Anniversary, Gold Maple Leaf | $50 | 1 oz | .9999 silver | .9999 gold | 31.65 | 7.96 | 39.61 | 36.07 |

== See also ==
- American Buffalo (coin)
- American Gold Eagle
- Britannia (coin)
- Bullion
- Canadian Silver Maple Leaf
- Canadian Platinum Maple Leaf
- Canadian Palladium Maple Leaf
- Gold as an investment
