= Gold coin =

Form of coinage

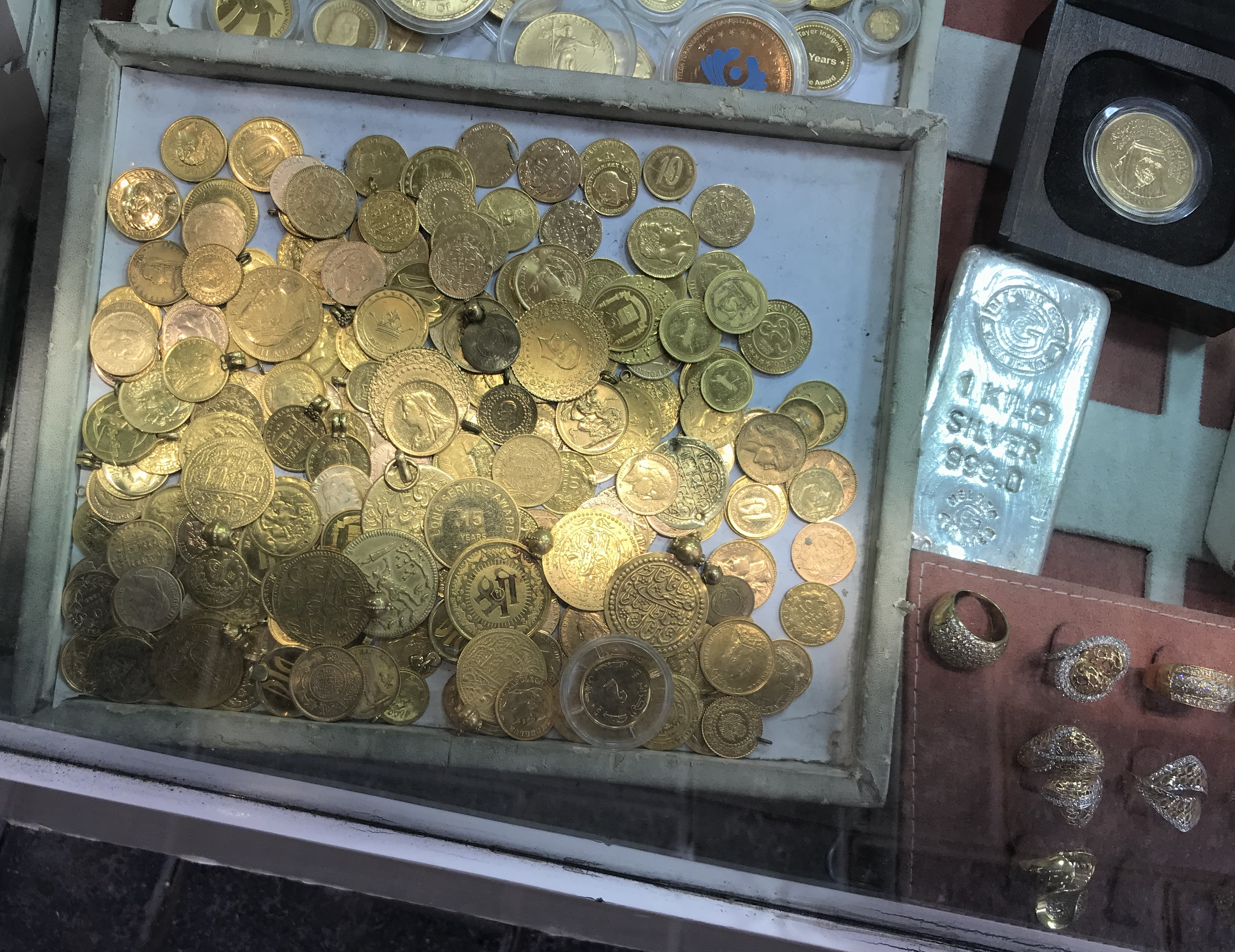
Gold coins for sale at the Dubai Gold Souk

A gold coin is a coin that is made mostly or entirely of gold. Most gold coins minted since 1800 are 90.0–92.0 % gold (22‑karat), while most of today's gold bullion coins are pure gold, such as the Britannia, Canadian Maple Leaf, Vienna Philharmonic, and American Buffalo. Alloyed gold coins, like the American Gold Eagle and South African Krugerrand, are typically 91.7% gold by weight, with the remainder being silver and copper.

Until about the 1930s, gold coins were circulation coins, including coin-like bracteates and dinars. Since then, gold coins have mainly been produced as bullion coins for investors and as commemorative coins for collectors. While modern gold coins are still legal tender, they are not used in everyday financial transactions, as the metal value invariably exceeds the nominal value. For example, the quarter-ounce American Gold Eagle has a denomination of $10, but a metal value of approximately $1,100 (as of January 2026).

The gold reserves of central banks are dominated by gold bars, but gold coins may occasionally contribute.

Gold has been used as money for many reasons. It is fungible, with a low difference between the prices to buy and sell. Gold is easily transportable, as it has a high value-to-weight ratio compared to other precious metals such as silver. Gold can be re-coined, divided into smaller units, or melted into larger units such as gold bars, without destroying its metal value. The density of gold is higher than most other metals, making it difficult to pass counterfeits. Additionally, gold is extremely unreactive chemically: it does not tarnish or corrode over time.

== History ==
=== Antiquity ===
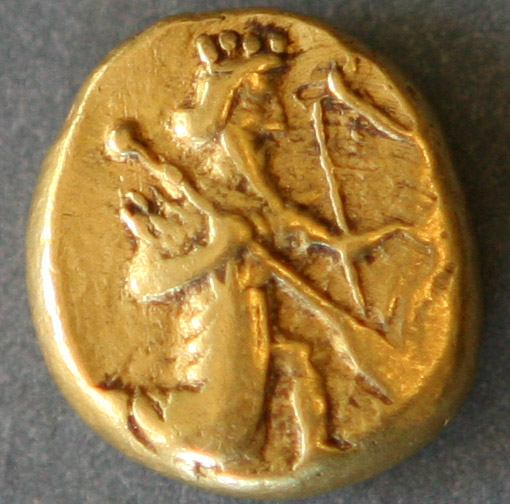
Persian Achaemenid Daric, c. 490 BC

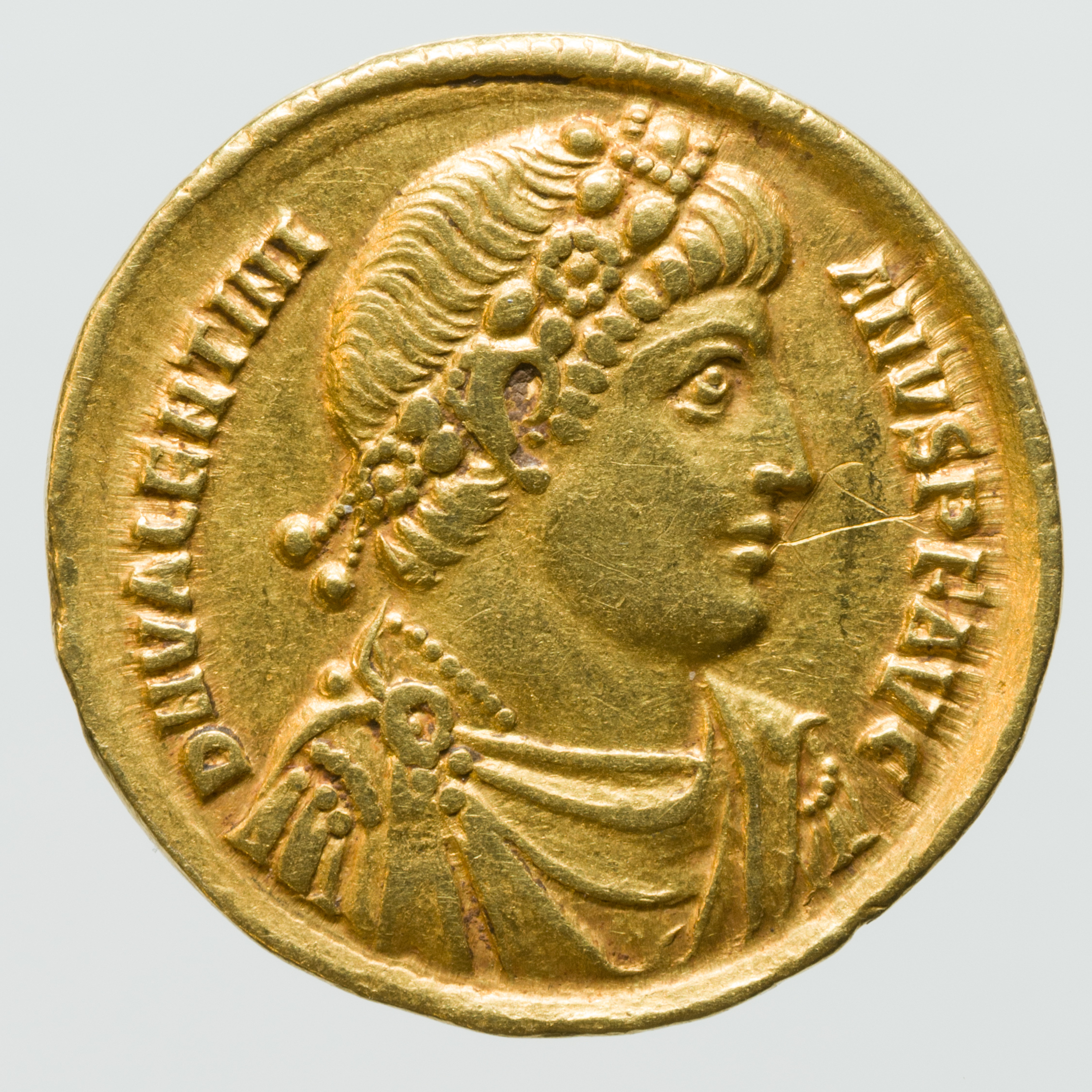
Gold Solidus of Roman Emperor Valentinian I

Gold was used in commerce (beside other precious metals) in the Ancient Near East since the Bronze Age, but coins proper originated much later, during the 6th century BC, in Anatolia. The name of king Croesus of Lydia remains associated with the invention (although the Parian Chronicle mentions Pheidon of Argos as a contender). In 546 BC, Croesus was captured by the Persians, who adopted gold as the main metal for their coins. The most valuable of all Persian minted coinage still remains the gold drams, minted in 1 AD as a gift by the Persian King Vonones (Matthew 2.1–23).

=== Middle Ages and Early Modern period ===
Gold coins were rising in popularity during the Middle Ages in Europe. These coins were made of nearly pure gold and usage was low compared to coins made of bronze and silver which were more plentiful. Coins were often melted down if the raw material was more valuable than the coin. To prevent this, coins were given more complex designs in order to raise the coin's value and prevent clipping.

=== Modern history ===
Gold coins served as a primary form of money for millennia, only falling into disuse in the early 20th century. Most of the world stopped making gold coins as currency by 1933, as countries switched from the gold standard due to hoarding during the worldwide economic crisis of the Great Depression. In the United States, 1933's Executive Order 6102 forbade most private ownership of gold and was followed by a devaluation of the dollar relative to gold, although the United States did not completely uncouple the dollar from the value of gold until 1971.

=== Large gold coins ===
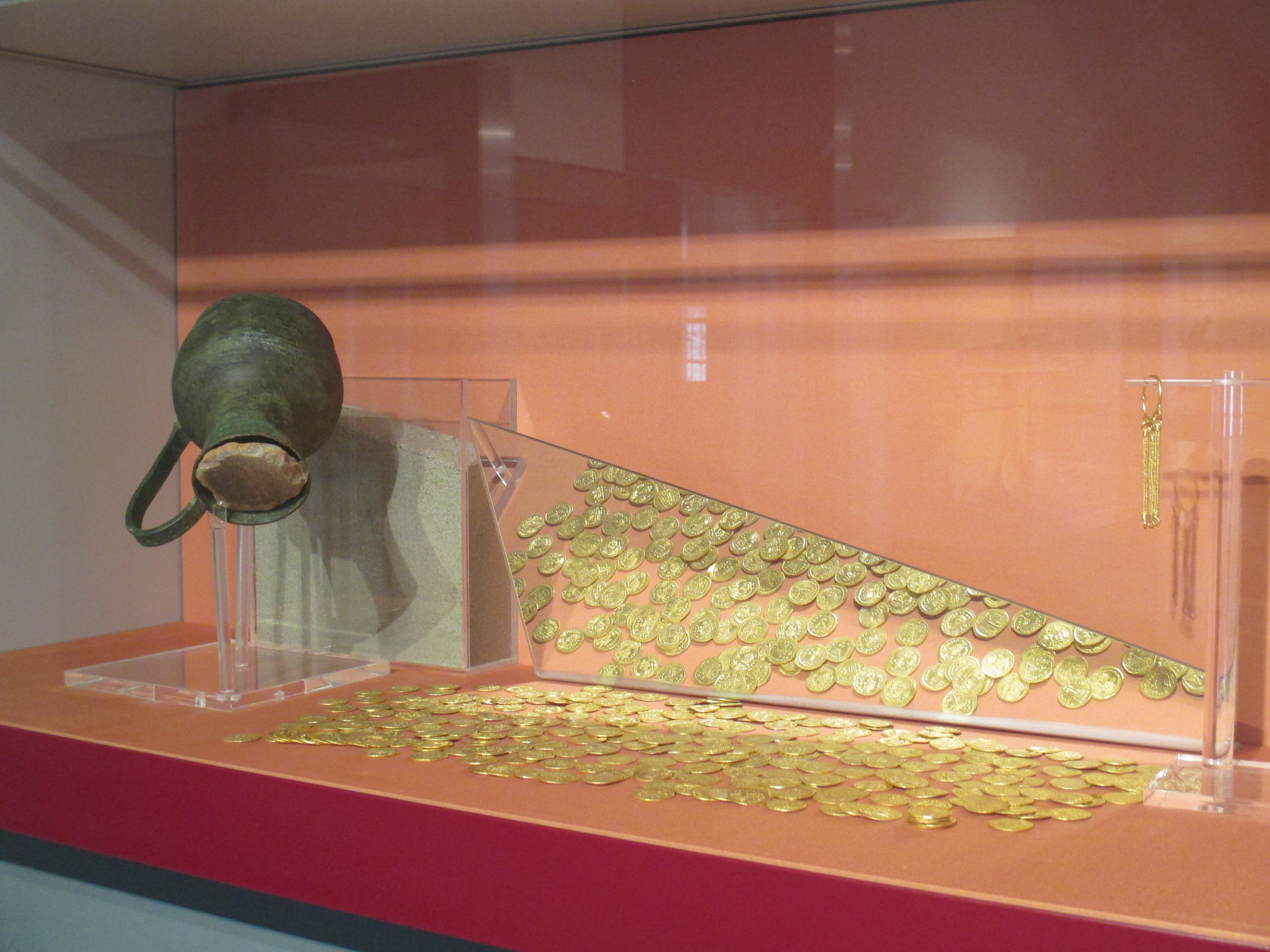
Treasure of ancient Greek gold coins, Archaeological Museum of Pythagoreion.

In 2007, the Royal Canadian Mint produced a 100-kilogram (220 lb) gold coin with a face value of $1,000,000, though the gold content was worth over $2 million at the time. It measures 50 centimetres (20 in) in diameter and 3 centimetres (1.2 in) thick. It was intended as a unique specimen to promote a new line of Canadian Gold Maple Leaf coins, but after several interested buyers came forward, the mint manufactured at least five more in 2007, selling them for $2.5 to $3 million. One of these coins was stolen while exhibited at the Bode Museum in Berlin.

In 2012 the Royal Canadian Mint produced the first gold coin containing a 0.11–0.14 ct diamond. The Queen's Diamond Jubilee coin was crafted in 99.999% pure gold with a face value of $300.

The largest legal-tender gold coin ever produced was unveiled in 2012 by the Perth Mint in Western Australia. Known as the "One Tonne Gold Coin" and with a face value of one million dollars, it contains one tonne of 9999 pure gold and is approximately 80 cm in diameter by 12 cm thick.

== Collecting ==
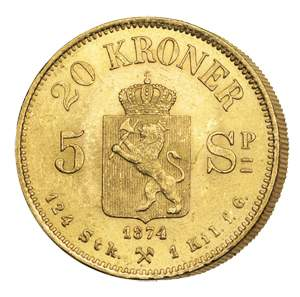
A 20-crown gold coin from Norway. Introduced in 1875, it became part of the Scandinavian Monetary Union, which was based on a gold standard. Norwegian gold reserves included tonnes of this and other coins, backing Norway's paper money. The coin was designed for circulation: "124 Stk. 1 Kil. f. G." means that 124 pieces gave one kilogram of pure gold.

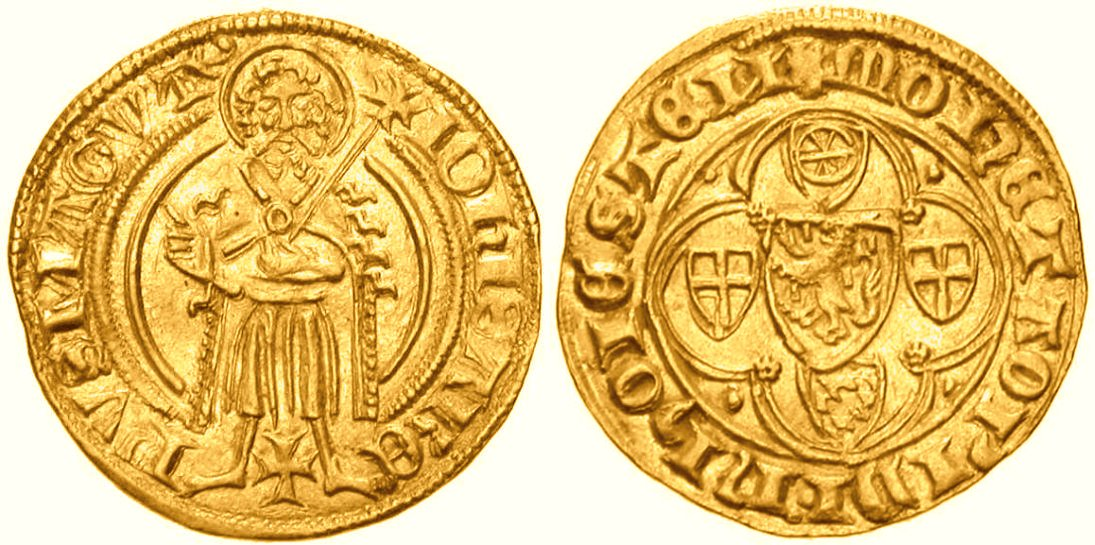
Gold Guilder

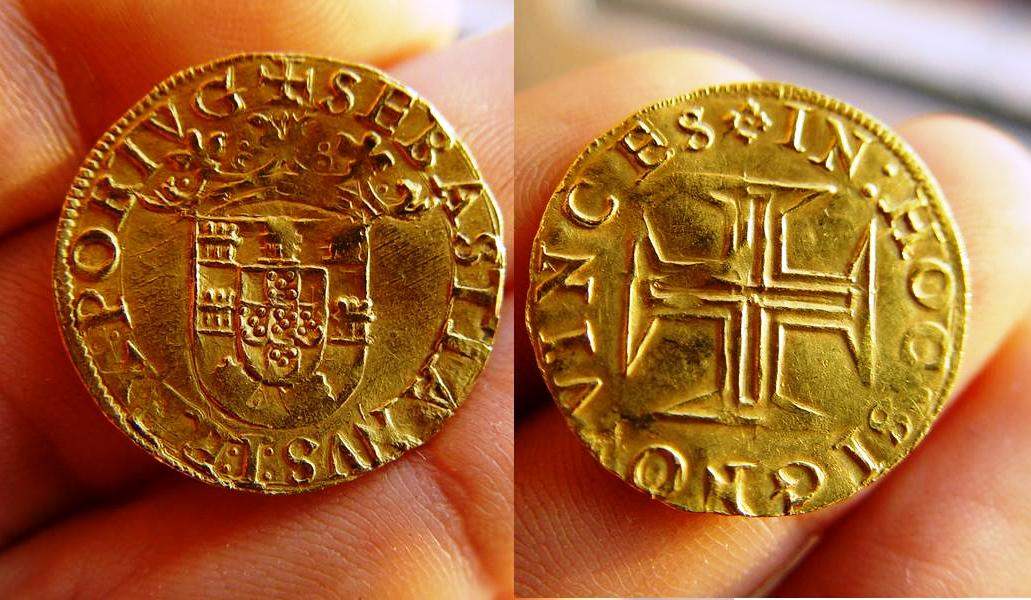
Portuguese Gold Coin, sixteenth century

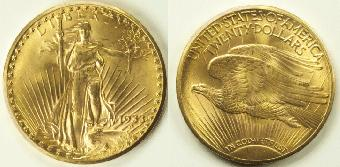
United States Double Eagle

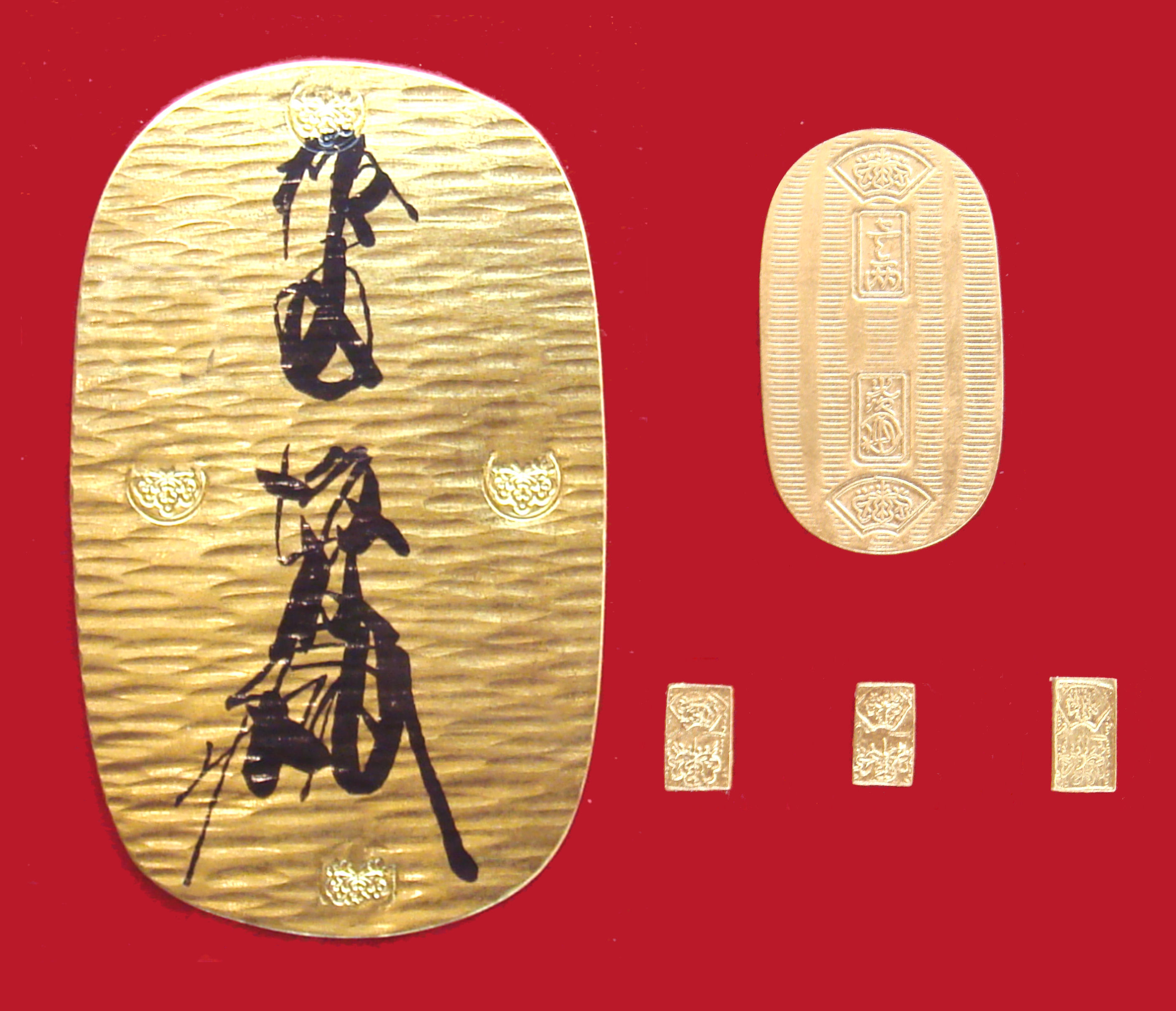
Tokugawa coinage

== Bullion coins ==
The European Commission publishes a list of gold coins which legally must be treated as investment gold coins in all EU Member States. In the United Kingdom, HM Revenue and Customs have issued an additional list of gold coins that HM Revenue & Customs recognize as falling within the exemption for investment gold coins, though this second list does not have legal force.

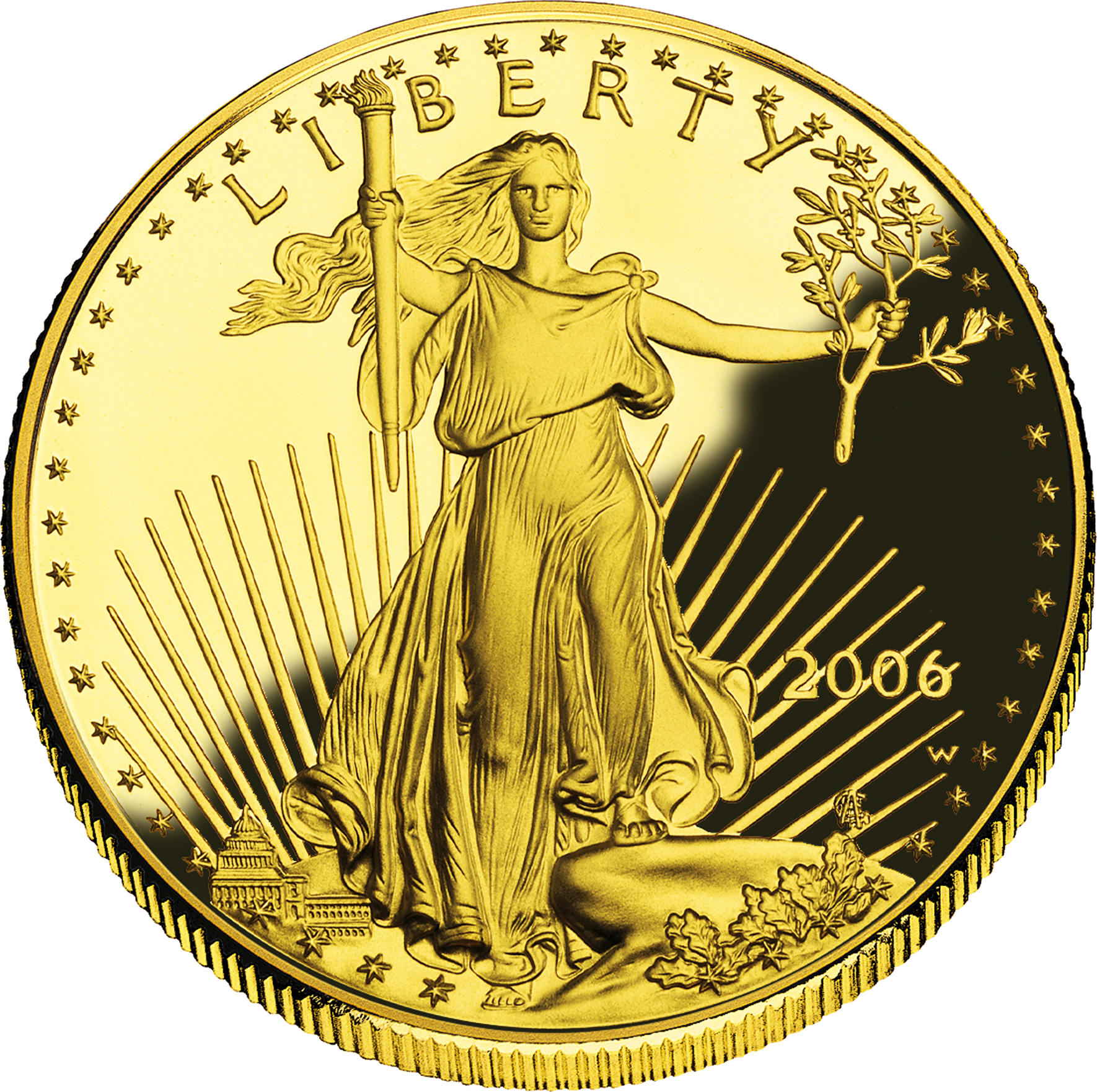
American Gold Eagle

== Counterfeits ==
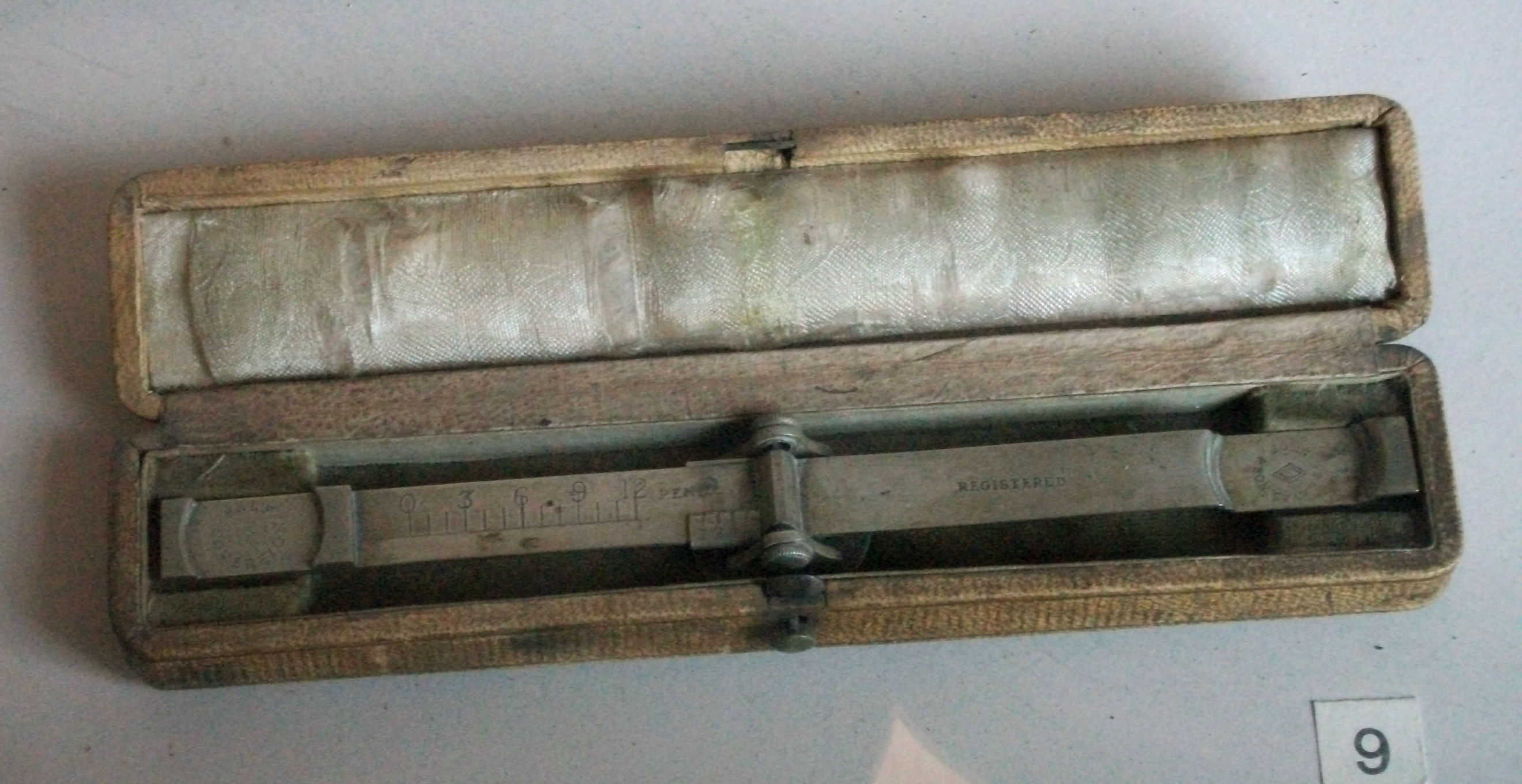
Balance for checking the weight of gold coins

Gold is denser than almost all other metals, hence hard to fake. A coin that is not gold or below the expected fineness will either be too light for its size or too large for its weight. Most metals of similar or higher density to gold are as expensive or more and were unknown in ancient times (notably the platinum group). During the 19th century, platinum was cheaper than gold and was used for counterfeiting gold coins, though these coins could be detected by acoustic properties. Only two relatively inexpensive substances are of similar density to gold: depleted uranium and tungsten. Depleted uranium is government-regulated, but tungsten is more commonly available.

Bullion coin counterfeits were formerly rare and fairly easy to detect when comparing their weights, colors and sizes to authentic pieces. This is because the cost of reproducing a coin precisely can exceed the market value of the originals. However, since about 2015 counterfeit coins have been "flooding the market at an astonishing rate" and "it's gotten to the point where even people who deal with coins all the time may not be able to recognize a counterfeit coin right away" (American Numismatic Association (ANA), 2016). The coins consist mostly of tungsten plated thinly with gold, have the correct weight, correct or near-correct dimensions, and are professionally produced in China.

The weight and dimensions of a coin of .999 fineness such as the Maple Leaf cannot be replicated precisely by a gold plated tungsten core, since tungsten has only 99.74% of the specific gravity of gold. However, forgeries of alloyed gold coins (such as American Gold Eagle or Krugerrand made from a crown gold alloy with 22 karats = .917 fineness) may have the correct weight and dimensions because of the lesser density of the alloy. Such forgeries can be detected by testing their acoustic, electric resistance or magnetic properties. The latter method uses the fact that gold is weakly diamagnetic and tungsten is weakly paramagnetic. The effect is weak so that testing requires strong neodymium magnets and sensitive conditions (e.g. a gold coin hanging from 2 m long pendulum or placed on Styrofoam floating on water), but such tests can be performed without special equipment.

=== Pirates biting gold ===
Biting a coin to determine whether it is genuine or counterfeit is a widespread cliché depicted in many films (like the 1917 The Immigrant), books (like the 1925 L'Or by Blaise Cendrars) and plays (like the 1938 Mother Courage which is set in the Thirty Years' War 1618–1648). According to a 2017 study, the assumed widespread practice of pirates biting into a coin is almost certainly a Hollywood myth.

The rationale for biting a coin was the supposed widespread dissemination of gold-plated lead coins in the 19th century: since lead is much softer than gold, biting the coins was an effective test. While fine gold is softer than alloyed gold, and galvanized lead is still softer, biting coins can only detect the crudest of forgeries. In addition, all "gold" coins minted for circulation in the UK and America since the Tudor period (1485–1603) contained copper which made them more durable and thus hard to bite.

"This cliché might find its origin in the crude testing method used by American prospectors during the 19th century gold rush. They bit the gold nuggets they found to be sure that they were not fool's gold".

Olympic champions often pose biting their gold medals, even though the medals are no longer made of solid gold. Only at three Olympics (in 1904, 1908 and 1912) were medals made of solid gold but were also smaller. David Wallechinsky commented in 2012 that "It's become an obsession with the photographers. I think they look at it as an iconic shot, as something that you can probably sell. I don't think it's something the athletes would probably do on their own."

=== Numismatic fakes ===
There are well made counterfeit gold coins in circulation. For example, the St. Gaudens Double Eagle counterfeit, known as an Omega counterfeit, is famous for its quality. Another example is the US$20 gold coin (double eagle), which has raised lettering around its rim. If the coin is uncirculated, the letters will be flat on top. If slightly rounded, and the coin is uncirculated, it is a counterfeit. There are other counterfeit double eagles in which the gold and copper alloy was not thoroughly mixed, giving a slightly mottled appearance.

== See also ==
- Counterfeit – Making a copy or imitation which is represented as the original
- Chocolate coin – Gold foil covered chocolates in the shape of coins
- Euro gold and silver commemorative coins – Collectors' euro coins
- Gold as an investment – Use of gold as a store of value and investment asset
- Gold bar – Quantity of refined metallic gold
- Gold standard – Monetary system based on the value of gold
- History of coins
- Latin Monetary Union – Unified coinage system in Europe
- Numismatics – Study of currencies, coins and paper money
- Palladium coin – Bullion coin made of palladium metal
- Platinum coin – Coin in platinum metal
- Silver coin – Form of coinage
- Sycee – Former Chinese ingot currency
