= Stavanger (disambiguation) =

Stavanger is a city and municipality in Norway.

Stavanger may also refer to:

- Stavanger, Illinois, United States
- Stavanger IF, a sports club; including handball
  - Stavanger IF Fotball, association football division

== Ships ==
- HNoMS Stavanger, several ships of the Royal Norwegian Navy
- MF Stavanger, a ferry of Norled
- RS 14 Stavanger, a rescue ship
