= Gold holdings of Norway =

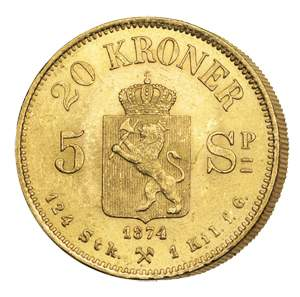
A 20-crown gold coin with the coat of arms of Norway

The gold holdings of Norway (Norwegian Bokmål: Norges gullbeholdning, Norges gullreserver), also known as Norway's gold reserves, were a formally defined entity related to Norges Bank's foreign-exchange reserves as well as the physical quantity of gold owned by the same central bank. During the eras of the gold standard, the national currency was in theory redeemable by a specific quantity of the state's gold holdings.

== Current status ==
In 2004, Norway's gold holdings consisted of approximately 37 tonnes divided on 33.5 tonnes of bars and 3.5 tonnes of coins. In 2004, Norges Bank—the central bank issuing the Norwegian crown—excluded gold from its forex reserves and sold all bars, except seven, on the international gold market in London.

Along with the seven gold bars, some gold coins were kept for museal purposes. Of approximately 415,000 coins, 393,000 (approx. 3.3 tonnes) are Norwegian 10-crown and 20-crown coins of the 19th and early 20th century, produced at the Mint in Kongsberg, while the others (approx. 200 kilos) originate in Sweden, Denmark, France, Austria, and Hungary.

== History ==
In April 1940, when Norway was invaded by Nazi Germany, the gold reserves included 48.8 or 60 tonnes. During the morning hours of 9 April, 818 boxes of 40 kilograms each, 685 boxes of 25 kg each, and 39 barrels of 80 kg each (a total of 53 tonnes of gold, of which 48.8 tonnes were in the form of bars) were brought out of Oslo parallel with the capital city's being invaded. The gold was subsequently transported to the United Kingdom by the British Royal Navy and, in June and July, further to Montreal, later Ottawa, in Canada and New York City in the United States. Only a small portion, approximately 178 kg (5,715 troy ounces), was kept in London. From 1940 to 1945, the gold holdings funded both the exiled King and Government as well as the resistance movement.

In 1987, approximately 10 tonnes of gold coins were returned to Norway from the United States Federal Reserve Bank and the Bank of Canada. The gold bars remained in the United States. Additionally, coins that were considered having no numismatic or historical value were remelted into bars.

In 1988, coin dealer Oslo Mynthandel, represented by Mr Jan Olav Aamlid, purchased 100,484 coins from the state's gold holdings and distributed them to collectors and investors.

In 2015, the Royal Canadian Mint commemorated the 1940 transport with a special issue (Allied Gold/L'or des alliés) of the Canadian Gold Maple Leaf.

== See also ==
- Flight of the Norwegian National Treasury

== Literature ==
- Museum of Cultural History (University of Oslo): The world's biggest coin deal (in English)
- Global Gold News: Norway – a rich country without any gold holdings 11 February 2014. (in English)
- Bank of Norway: Norges Bank har solgt deler av gullreserven, men beholder myntene fra gulltransporten 28 January 2004 (in Norwegian)
- Bank of Norway: FAQ - Gull 14 November 2007 (in Norwegian)
- GullNorge.no: Norsk gullhistorie (in Norwegian)
- Bank of Norway: Gulltransporten: Slik ble landets gullreserver reddet 2016(?) (in Norwegian)
- Aftenposten: Vil stille ut Norges gullskatt 18 March 2005 (in Norwegian)
- Dagens Næringsliv: Gullet Hitler ikke fikk 7 May 2014 (in Norwegian)
