= Flora (sculpture) =

Wax sculpture by Richard Cockle Lucas

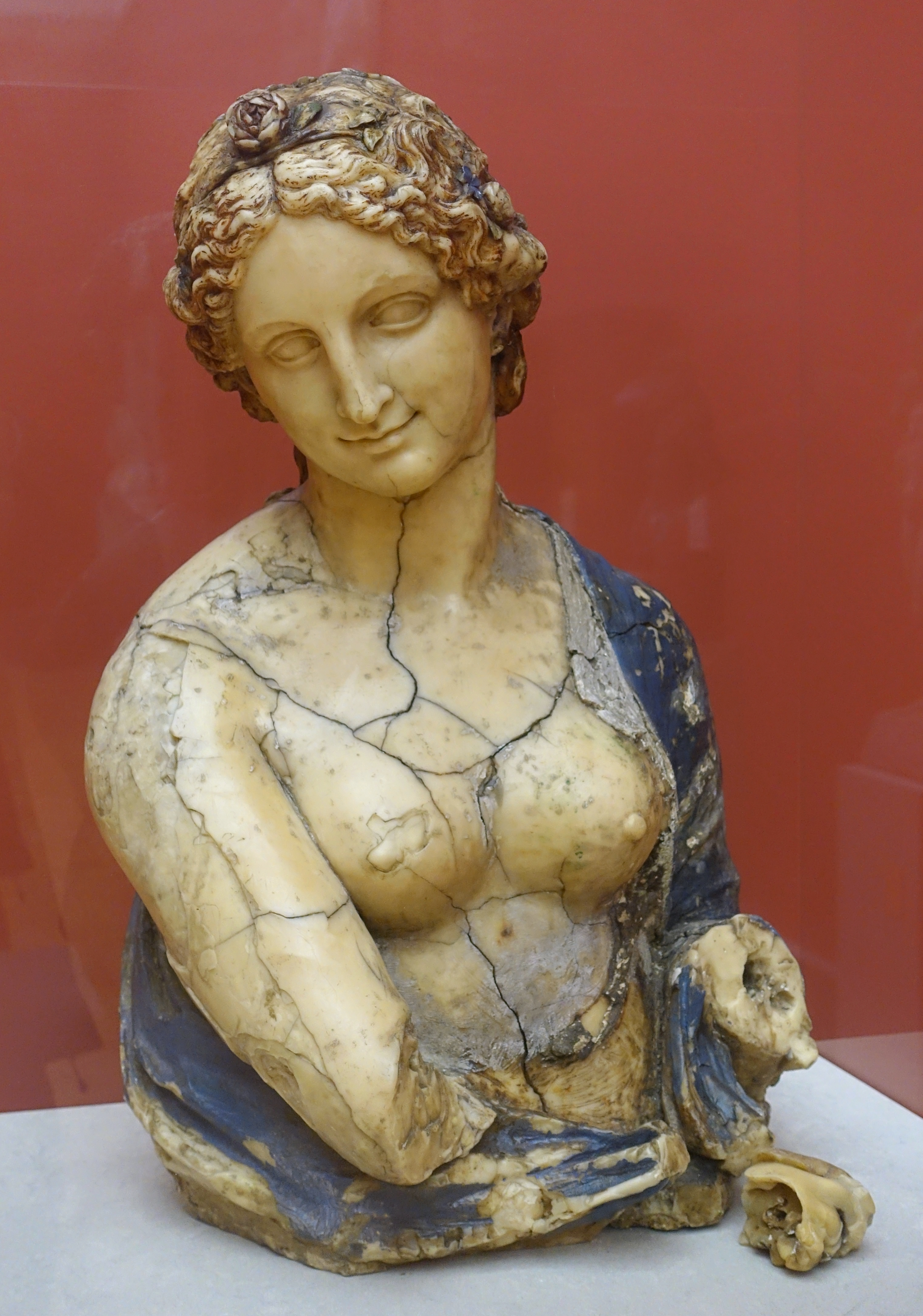

Flora is a wax sculpture of Roman goddess Flora by English sculptor Richard Cockle Lucas, currently located in the Bode Museum in Berlin.

== Provenance ==
Wilhelm von Bode, the general manager of the Prussian Art Collections for the Berlin Museum, spotted the bust in a London gallery and purchased it for a few pounds for the Kaiser Friedrich Museum in 1909. Bode was convinced that the bust was by Leonardo da Vinci and the Berlin Museum authorities, and the German public, were delighted to have "snatched a great art treasure from under the very noses" of the British art world.

In 1910, it was revealed that the work may have actually been created by the English sculptor, Richard Cockle Lucas. Shortly after the purchase, The Times ran an article claiming that the bust was the work of Lucas, having been commissioned to produce it from a painting. Lucas's son, Albert, then came forward and swore under oath that the story was correct and that he had helped his father to make it. Albert was able to explain how the layers of wax had been built up from old candle ends; he also described how his father would stuff various debris, including newspapers, inside the bust. When the Berlin museum staff removed the base they found the debris, just as Albert had described it, including a letter dated in the 1840s.

Despite this evidence, Bode continued to claim that his original attribution was correct. To support this, he displayed the Flora bust among a selection of Lucas's lesser work – this exhibition rather backfired, however, as it showed that Lucas had been regularly making wax sculptures inspired by the great works of previous times.

In April 2021, the bust was dated using carbon-14, which confirmed that it was sculpted in the 19th century. The bust remains on display in what is now the Bode Museum labeled "England", "19th Century" with a question mark.
