= RS 14 Stavanger =

Rescue ship built in 1901

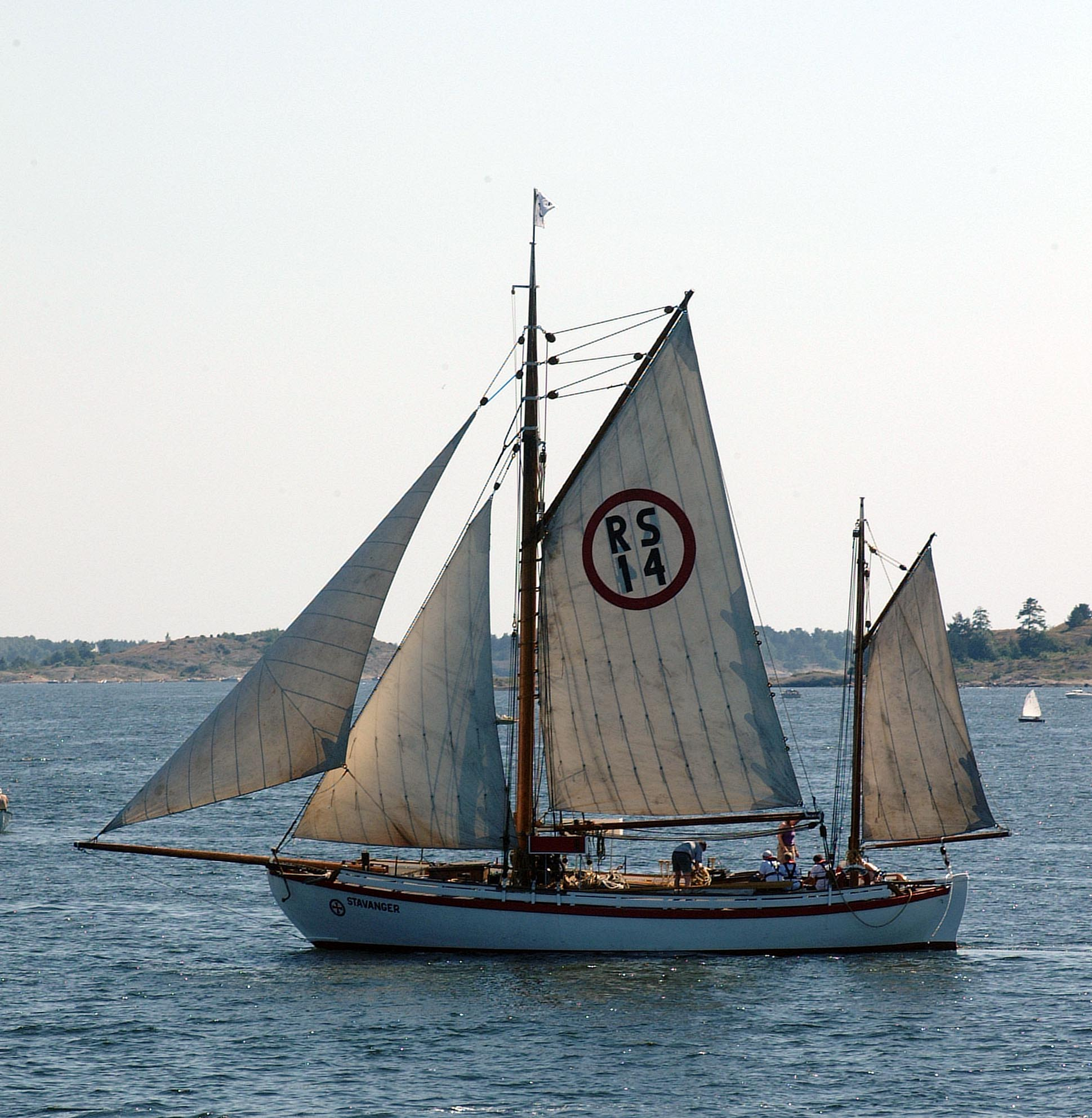

History
- Name: Stavanger
- Owner: Stiftelsen Tollerodden
- Builder: Colin Archer
- Launched: 1901
- Completed: 1901
- In service: 1901-1938
- Out of service: 1938
- Status: Museum vessel

General characteristics
- Type: Sea rescue vessel
- Length: 14.35 metres (47.1 ft)
- Beam: 4.65 metres (15.3 ft)
- Height: 4.65 metres (15.3 ft)
- Draught: 2.35 metres (7 ft 9 in)

RS 14 Stavanger is a rescue ship built for the Norwegian Society for Sea Rescue in 1901, in accordance to drawings by Colin Archer. She was in service until 1938. In 2018, RS 14 Stavanger became the cover motif of the 500 kroner banknote in the new banknote series that was introduced in 2017.

== History ==
RS 14 Stavanger was stationed at Titran in Trøndelag in 1901, as a result of the 1899 disaster when 29 ships sank and 140 fishermen perished in a severe hurricane. The rescue vessel remained on Titran until 1938 when she was sold to Jul Nielsen and used as a pleasure boat.

Jul Nielsen was an experienced sailor and sailed the ship across the Atlantic, in the Mediterranean, in the North Sea and along the entire Norwegian coast. The RS 14 became the most famous vintage boat in Norwegian waters. After several extensive renovations, RS14 was sold to Stiftelsen Tollerodden and became a museum ship at the old shipyard in Larvik.
