= Flight of the Norwegian National Treasury =

WW2 transfer of Norway's gold reserves to the US

The Flight of the Norwegian National Treasury was the transfer of Norway's gold reserves to Canada via the United Kingdom, to avoid them falling into the hands of Nazi Germany.

The National Treasury of Norway consisted of 50 tonnes of gold worth 240 million kr in 1940 (approximately US$54.5 million in 1940, or US$1.8 billion in 2015.)

When the German invasion of Norway began, the gold was evacuated from Oslo first overland to Åndalsnes and then by ship to Tromsø. From Tromsø, evacuating Allied forces shipped the gold to Britain, despite German ground and air attacks. The gold was later shipped to North America and most was sold to fund the Norwegian government in exile. Ten tonnes returned to Norway in 1987.

== Evacuation from Oslo ==
The gold was stored in the main vault of the Norges Bank's headquarters in Oslo. During the increasing tension of the 1930s, plans were made to make the gold more mobile. When the Second World War broke out, these plans were accelerated and the gold was packed into 818 crates of 40 kilograms (88 lb), 685 crates of 25 kilograms (55 lb) and 39 barrels of gold coins, weighing 80 kilograms (180 lb) each: a total of 53 tonnes (52 long tons; 58 short tons).

When news reached the government in the early hours of 9 April 1940 that the patrol boat Pol III had been attacked and that enemy ships were approaching Oslo, orders went out to evacuate the gold to the vault in Lillehammer. Forklifts from local businesses were used to load the gold onto 26 civilian lorries. The last lorries left Oslo hours before the Wehrmacht arrived.

== By train and lorry to Åndalsnes ==
The gold stayed at Lillehammer for a few days before having to move again due to the German advance. It was loaded onto a train and travelled across country away from the German advance. Meanwhile, the Norwegian government and King Haakon VII were separately evading the German advance. German paratroopers attempted to reach Lillehammer in buses to capture the dignitaries and gold, but were stopped by an improvised defence at Midtskogen. Norwegian troops from Jørstadmoen, including poet Nordahl Grieg, were deployed to Lillehammer to guard the train.

The train left Lillehammer on 19 April, and arrived in Åndalsnes on 20 April, where British expeditionary troops had landed a few days before. Åndalsnes was bombed several times by the Germans. The train was undamaged in the bombings and was moved to Romsdalshorn station, outside Åndalsnes. The British were informed of the gold, and agreed to evacuate it to Britain and then perhaps onwards to America. The gold was to be split between three ships. The first, the British cruiser HMS Galatea departed from Åndalsnes on 25 April, with 200 crates.

== By ship to Tromsø ==
No further loading was done at Åndalsnes due to the approach of German troops through the Gudbrandsdalen valley, as well as further air raids. The gold was moved on 23-28 lorries to Molde, to be embarked on the British cruiser HMS Glasgow with the king and the government, and taken to Tromsø and then to Britain. The city was being bombed when they arrived. 756 crates and all 39 barrels were loaded onto Glasgow before, late on Monday 29 April, Captain Pegram judged that they could wait no longer and ordered the ship north to Tromsø. 18 tonnes (18 long tons; 20 short tons) of gold, in 301 large and 246 smaller crates, were left behind. The coastal steamer Driva took on most of the remainder before bombing suspended the loading. The 30 crates left by Driva were moved by lorries to Gjemnes, to be picked up by the steamer on its way north to Tromsø.

Driva was attacked by German aircraft several times and beached to avoid sinking. The gold was transferred to five fishing vessels from Bud and Hustad. These were Heimdal, Barden, Svanen, Leif and Gudrun, captained by Hans M. Inderhaug, Harald Tungehaug, Engvald Sunde, Emil Skottheim and Alfred Skottheim respectively. As hoped, the fishing vessels did not draw attention and they arrived at Gjemnes without incident, and the 30 crates brought north by road were picked up. The five boats continued north to Titran, arriving at the island of Frøya in Sør-Trøndelag county on 3 May. The soldiers from Jørstadmoen were sent home, and the gold was transferred to two larger fishing vessels. The Alfhild II and Stølvåg left Frøya on 4 May, and arrived in Tromsø on 8 May.

== Evacuation overseas ==
In Tromsø, the gold was loaded onto the British cruiser HMS Enterprise. The cruiser sailed south to Harstad, before departing on 25 May. Enterprise survived two German air attacks en route to Scapa Flow. From there, she sailed to Greenock, where the gold was brought ashore. The gold was taken by train to the Bank of England's vault in London. Finally, the gold was shipped in installments across the Atlantic Ocean to America and to Canada. Of the 50 tonnes from Oslo, the only losses were 297 gold coins from a barrel damaged during transit aboard a British vessel.

The gold was gradually sold in the United States – partly to fund the government in exile. Ten tonnes of gold coins returned to Norway in 1987.

== In popular culture ==
- Snow Treasure — an American children's novel giving a fictionalised account of the gold's transport.
- Pimpernel Gold: How Norway foiled the Nazis — a partially fictionalized account of the story, by Dorothy Baden-Powell.
- Gold Run (Norwegian: Gulltransporten) — a 2022 Norwegian film about the gold's transport.

== See also ==
- Gold reserves of Norway
- Operation Fish
- Moscow Gold
- Romanian Treasure, the Romanian gold reserves sent (alongside other valuable objects) to Russia for safekeeping during World War I, but never returned.
