= Stanley Witten =

Canadian artist and engraver

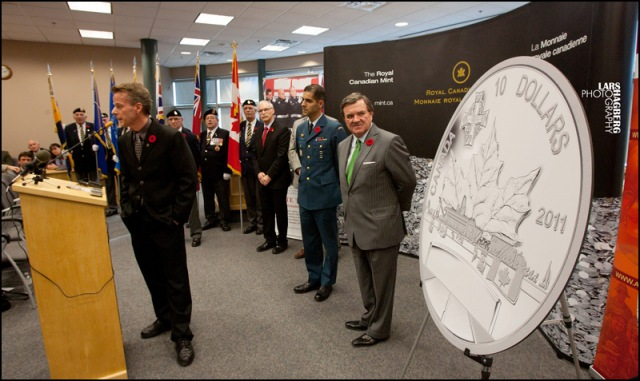
- Witten addressing at the 2011 Highway of Heroes coin unveiling in Trenton, Ontario.
- Born: Edmonton, Alberta, Canada
- Occupations: Engraver; artist
- Notable work: Terry Fox loonie; Big Maple Leaf

Stanley Witten is a Canadian artist and engraver. Witten has received national recognition in Canada for his coin designs, including Big Maple Leaf in 2003, and the Terry Fox loonie in 2005.

== History ==
Stanley Witten has worked for the Royal Canadian Mint since 1990 and became Senior Engraver in 2002.

In 2005, the design of Witten's Terry Fox loonie was unveiled. The coin depicts the Canadian cancer research activist and athlete Terry Fox. After the coin was unveiled, Witten explained to the Ottawa Citizen that "while sculpting the design, I wanted to capture Terry fighting the elements, running against the wind, towering over wind-bent trees on a lonely stretch of Canadian wilderness". As a result of die polishing, some strikings of Witten's design are without grass.

In 2018, Witten designed Canada's first 99.99% gold coin; following the unveiling of the design, Maclean's Magazine wrote that Witten had "slaved over the minute detailing on both sides of the coin".

== Recognition ==
In 2007, Witten received a Guinness World Record for designing the world's largest gold coin.

In 2009, Witten received the Royal Canadian Numismatic Association's Presidential Award.
