= Norwegian krone =

Currency of Norway

Krone
norsk krone (Norwegian); Norgga ruvdno (Northern Sami)
- 500 kroner banknote obverse

ISO 4217
- Code: NOK (numeric: 578)
- Subunit: 0.01

Units of account
- Base unit: krone
- Plural: kroner
- Symbol: kr
- Subunit
- 1/100: øre
- Plural
- øre: øre

Denominations
- Banknotes
- Freq. used: 50, 100, 200, 500 kroner
- Rarely used: 1000 kroner
- Coins: 1, 5, 10, 20 kroner

Demographics
- Date of introduction: 1875
- Replaced: Norwegian speciedaler
- User(s): Kingdom of Norway

Issuance
- Central bank: Norges Bank
- Website: www.norges-bank.no

Valuation
- Inflation: 2.4%
- Source: Norges Bank, November 2024
- Method: Consumer price index

The krone (Norwegian: [ˈkrûːnə], abbreviation: kr (also NKr for distinction); code: NOK), plural kroner, is the currency of the Kingdom of Norway (including overseas territories and dependencies). It was traditionally known as the Norwegian crown in English; however, this has fallen out of common usage. It is nominally subdivided into 100 øre, although the last coins denominated in øre were withdrawn in 2012.

The krone was the thirteenth-most-traded currency in the world by value in April 2010, down three positions from 2007. It is considered to be one of the world's G10 currencies, a group of the most traded currencies in the world.

The Norwegian krone is also informally accepted in many shops in Sweden and Finland that are close to the Norwegian border, and also in some shops in the Danish ferry ports of Hirtshals and Frederikshavn. Norwegians spent 14.1 billion NOK on border shopping in 2015 compared to 10.5 billion NOK spent in 2010. Border shopping is a fairly common practice amongst Norwegians, though it is seldom done on impulse. Money is spent mainly on food articles, alcohol, and tobacco, in that order, usually in bulk or large quantities. This is due to considerably higher taxes and fees on tobacco and alcohol purchased domestically in Norway.

== History ==
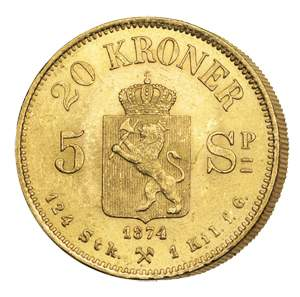
A 20-crown gold coin dated 1874. The text '124 Stk. 1 Kil. f. G.' means that 124 pieces gave one kilogram of pure gold.

The krone was introduced in 1875, replacing the Norwegian speciedaler/spesidaler at a rate of 4 kroner = 1 speciedaler. In doing so, Norway joined the Scandinavian Monetary Union, which had been established in 1873. The Scandinavian currencies were mutually exchangeable at par until 1914 with the suspension of the gold standard due to World War I. After this date, the currencies of Denmark, Norway, and Sweden ceased to be mutually equivalent to each other.

Within the Scandinavian Monetary Union, the krone was on a gold standard of 2,480 kroner = 1 kilogram of pure gold (1 krone = 403.226 milligrams of gold). The gold standard was suspended from 1914 to 1916 and from 1920 to 1928, and in 1931 it was permanently suspended. In 1933 the krone was pegged to the pound sterling at 1 pound = 19.9 kroner, and in 1939 the krone was pegged to the U.S. dollar at $1 = 4.4 kroner.

During the German occupation (1940–1945) in the Second World War, the krone was initially pegged to the Reichsmark at a rate of 1 krone = 0.6 Reichsmark, later reduced to 0.57. After the war, a peg of 1 pound = 20 kroner was established in 1946, equivalent to US$1 = 4.963 kroner before the 1949 devaluation of sterling revised it to US$1 = 7.142 kroner.

In December 1992, the Central Bank of Norway abandoned the fixed exchange rate system in favor of floating exchange rates (managed float) due to the heavy speculation against the Norwegian currency in the early 1990s, which forced the central bank to make around 2 billion kroner in defensive purchases of the NOK through the usage of foreign currency reserves.

=== Summary of denominations issued ===
Denomination	Notes			Coins		
Denomination	Printed	Invalid	Comments	Minted	Invalid	Comments
1 øre	—			1876–1972	1988	Bronze, iron 1918–1921 & 1941–1945
2 øre	—			1876–1972	1988	Bronze, iron 1917–1920 & 1943–1945
5 øre	—			1875–1982	1988	Bronze, iron 1917–1920 & 1941–1945
10 øre	—			1874–1991	2003	Silver 1874–1919, cupro-nickel 1920–92 (holed 1924–51), zinc 1941–1945
25 øre	—			1876–1982	1988	Silver 1876–1919, cupro-nickel 1921–82 (holed 1921–50), zinc 1943–1945
50 øre	—			1874–2012	2012	Silver 1874–1919, cupro-nickel 1920–96 (holed 1920–49), zinc 1941–1945, bronze 1996–2012
1 krone	1917–1925; 1940–1950	1926; 1999	Wartime "coin notes"	1875–	—	Silver 1875–1917, cupro-nickel 1925– (holed 1925–1951, 1997–)
2 kroner	1918–1925; 1940–1950	1926; 1999	Wartime "coin notes"	1876–1917	1922	Silver 1878–1917
5 kroner	1877–1963	1999	Replaced by coin 1963	1963–	—	Cupro-nickel (holed 1998–)
10 kroner	1877–1984	1999	Replaced by coin 1984	1983–	—	Nickel-brass
20 kroner	—			1994–	—	Nickel-brass
50 kroner	1877–	—		—		
100 kroner	1877–	—		—		
200 kroner	1994–	—		—		
500 kroner	1877–	—		—		
1000 kroner	1877–	—		—		

== Coins ==
In 1875, coins were introduced (some dated 1874) in denominations of 10 and 50 øre and 1 and 10 kroner. These coins also bore the denomination in the previous currency, as 3, 15, and 30 skillings and 2 1/2 specidaler. Between 1875 and 1878, the new coinage was introduced in full, in denominations of 1, 2, 5, 10, 25, and 50 øre and 1, 2, and 10 kroner. The 1, 2, and 5 øre were struck in bronze; the 10, 25, and 50 øre and 1 and 2 kroner, in silver; and the 10 and 20 kroner, in gold.

The last gold coins were issued in 1910; silver was replaced by cupro-nickel in 1920. Between 1917 and 1921, iron temporarily replaced bronze. 1917 also saw the last issuance of 2 kroner coins. During the German occupation of Norway in the Second World War, zinc was used in place of cupro-nickel in 10, 25, and 50 øre coins and production of the 1 krone piece was suspended.

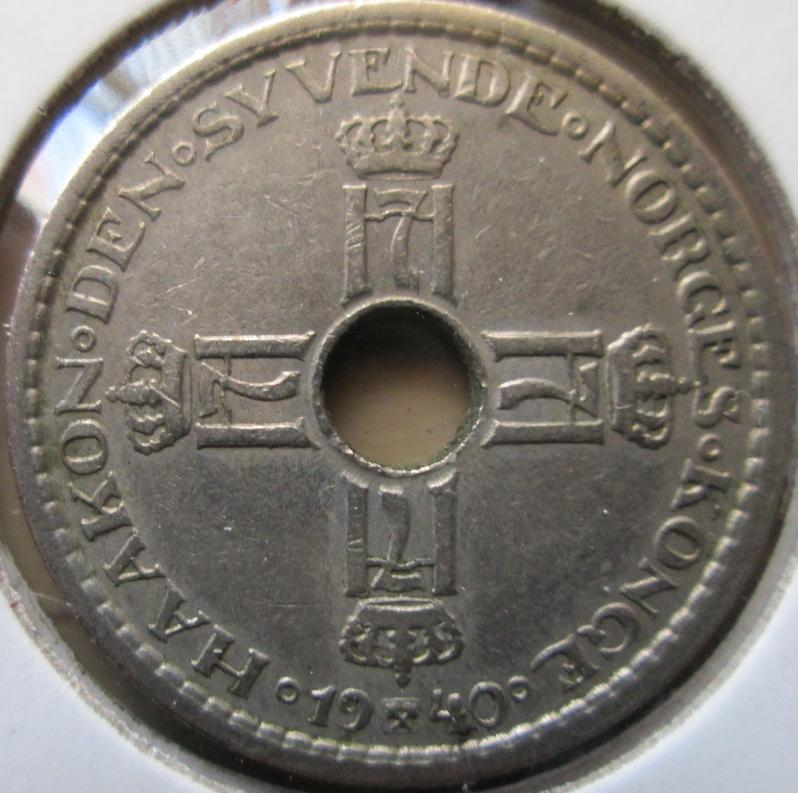
The obverse of a 1940 Norwegian krone.

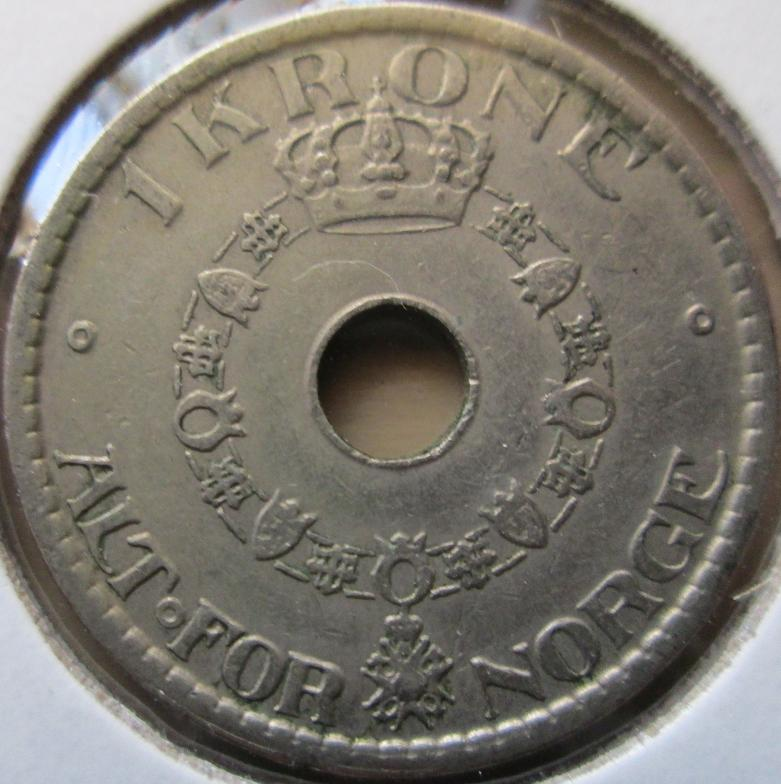
The reverse of the 1940 krone.

In 1963, 5 kroner coins were introduced. Production of 1 and 2 øre coins ceased in 1972. The following year, the size of the 5-øre coin was reduced; production of the denomination ceased in 1982, along with the minting of the 25 øre. Ten-kroner coins were introduced in 1983. In 1992, the last 10 øre coins were minted.

Between 1994 and 1998, a new coinage was introduced, consisting of 50 øre, 1, 5, 10, and 20 kroner. With the exception of the 50 øre, these are the only coins that are currently legal tender. The 50-øre was withdrawn on 1 May 2012 after ceasing to circulate as an ordinary coin used for payment, and banks in Norway would still redeem them for higher denominations until 2022.

Circulating coins
Image	Value	Technical parameters				Description			Issued from
Image	Value	Diameter (mm)	Thickness (mm)	Mass (g)	Composition	Edge	Obverse	Reverse	Issued from
	1 krone	21.00 (holed)	1.70	4.35	Cupronickel: Cu: 75% Ni: 25%	Smooth	Harald V's monogram Lettering: Norge	Fowl; value; year of issue	1997
	5 kroner	26.00 (holed)	2.00	7.85	Cupronickel: Cu: 75% Ni: 25%	Reeded	St. Olav's Order; Lettering: Kongeriket Noreg	Acanthi leaves; value; year of issue	1998
	10 kroner	24.00	2.00	6.80	Copper: 81% Zinc: 10% Nickel: 9%	Interrupted reeding	Harald V	Stave church roof; value; year of issue	1995
	20 kroner	27.50	2.00	9.90	Copper: 81% Zinc: 10% Nickel: 9%	Smooth	Harald V	Viking ship; value; year of issue	1994
For table standards, see the coin specification table.

The 10 and 20 kroner coins carry the effigy of the current monarch. Previously the 1 and 5 kroner coins also carried the royal effigy, but now these denominations are decorated only with stylistic royal or national symbols. The royal motto of the monarch (King Harald's motto is Alt for Norge, meaning "Everything for Norway") is also inscribed on the 10 kroner coin.

Coins and banknotes of the Norwegian krone are distributed by the Central Bank of Norway.

Up to 25 coins of any single denomination is considered tvungent betalingsmiddel—a legally recognized method of payment, in which the intended recipient can not refuse payment, according to Norwegian law.

=== Use of 10 Syrian pound coins in Norway ===
The characteristics of the ten Syrian pound (LS 10) coin have been found to so closely resemble the Norwegian 20 kroner (NKr 20) coin that it can be used as a slug to fool vending machines, coins-to-cash machines, arcade machines, and any other coin-operated, automated service machine in the country. Machines are unable to tell the coins apart, owing to their almost identical weight and size.

As of mid-February 2017, LS 10 was worth NKr 0.39, making the 20-kroner coin 51.5 times more valuable than the 10-pound coin. While not easy to find in Norway, the Syrian coins are still used in automated machines there with such frequency that Posten Norge, the Norwegian postal service, decided to close many of their coins-to-cash machines on 18 February 2006, with plans to develop a system able to differentiate between the two coins. In the summer of 2005, a Norwegian man was sentenced to 30 day suspended sentence, for having used Syrian coins in arcade machines in the municipality of Bærum.

== Banknotes ==
In 1877, Norges Bank introduced notes for 5, 10, 50, 100, 500, and 1000 kroner. In 1917, 1 krone notes were issued, and 2 kroner notes were issued between 1918 and 1922. Because of metal shortages, 1 and 2 kroner notes were again issued between 1940 and 1950. In 1963, 5 kroner notes were replaced by coins, with the same happening to the 10 kroner notes in 1984. Two hundred kroner notes were introduced in 1994.

The Sea series (2017) Designers: Terje Tønnessen; Metric Design (obverse) and Snøhetta Design (reverse)
Image		Value	Dimensions (mm)	Main colour	Description		Issue
Obverse	Reverse	Value	Dimensions (mm)	Main colour	Obverse	Reverse	Issue
		50 kr	126 × 70	Green	Utvær Lighthouse	Stylized lighthouse beacon, Big Dipper	2018
		100 kr	133 × 70	Red	Gokstad ship	Stylized container ship, Orion, globe	2017
		200 kr	140 × 70	Blue	Codfish	Stylized fishing boat, fishing net, sea mark	2017
		500 kr	147 × 70	Yellow	RS 14 Stavanger	Stylized oil platform, gas pipeline networks, ammonite	2018
		1000 kr	154 × 70	Purple	Wave in the sea	Stylized open sea, water molecules	2019
For table standards, see the banknote specification table.

== Exchange rates ==
Most traded currencies by value Currency distribution of global foreign exchange market turnover
Currency	ISO 4217 code	Proportion of daily volume		Change (2022–2025)
Currency	ISO 4217 code	April 2022	April 2025	Change (2022–2025)
United States dollar	USD	88.4%	89.2%	▲0.8pp
Euro	EUR	30.6%	28.9%	▼1.7pp
Japanese yen	JPY	16.7%	16.8%	▲0.1pp
Pound sterling	GBP	12.9%	10.2%	▼2.7pp
Renminbi	CNY	7.0%	8.5%	▲1.5pp
Swiss franc	CHF	5.2%	6.4%	▲1.2pp
Australian dollar	AUD	6.4%	6.1%	▼0.3pp
Canadian dollar	CAD	6.2%	5.8%	▼0.4pp
Hong Kong dollar	HKD	2.6%	3.8%	▲1.2pp
Singapore dollar	SGD	2.4%	2.4%	Steady
Indian rupee	INR	1.6%	1.9%	▲0.3pp
South Korean won	KRW	1.8%	1.8%	Steady
Swedish krona	SEK	2.2%	1.6%	▼0.6pp
Mexican peso	MXN	1.5%	1.6%	▲0.1pp
New Zealand dollar	NZD	1.7%	1.5%	▼0.2pp
Norwegian krone	NOK	1.7%	1.3%	▼0.4pp
New Taiwan dollar	TWD	1.1%	1.2%	▲0.1pp
Brazilian real	BRL	0.9%	0.9%	Steady
South African rand	ZAR	1.0%	0.8%	▼0.2pp
Polish złoty	PLN	0.7%	0.8%	▲0.1pp
Danish krone	DKK	0.7%	0.7%	Steady
Indonesian rupiah	IDR	0.4%	0.7%	▲0.3pp
Turkish lira	TRY	0.4%	0.5%	▲0.1pp
Thai baht	THB	0.4%	0.5%	▲0.1pp
Israeli new shekel	ILS	0.4%	0.4%	Steady
Hungarian forint	HUF	0.3%	0.4%	▲0.1pp
Czech koruna	CZK	0.4%	0.4%	Steady
Chilean peso	CLP	0.3%	0.3%	Steady
Philippine peso	PHP	0.2%	0.2%	Steady
Colombian peso	COP	0.2%	0.2%	Steady
Malaysian ringgit	MYR	0.2%	0.2%	Steady
UAE dirham	AED	0.4%	0.1%	▼0.3pp
Saudi riyal	SAR	0.2%	0.1%	▼0.1pp
Romanian leu	RON	0.1%	0.1%	Steady
Peruvian sol	PEN	0.1%	0.1%	Steady
Other currencies		2.6%	3.4%	▲0.8pp
Total (Note: The total sum is 200% because each currency trade is counted twice: once for the currency being bought and once for the currency being sold. The percentages above represent the proportion of all trades involving a given currency, regardless of which side of the transaction it is on.)		200.0%	200.0%	

The cost of one euro in Norwegian krone (from 1999)

The value of the Norwegian krone compared to other currencies varies considerably from one year to another, mainly based on changes in oil prices and interest rates. In 2002 the Norwegian krone grew to record high levels against the United States dollar and the euro. On 2 January 2002, 100 kroner were worth US$11.14 ($1 = 8.98 kroner). In July 2002, the krone hit a high at 100 kroner = $13.7 ($1 = 7.36 kroner). In addition to the high level of interest, which increased further on 4 July 2002, to 7 percent, the price of oil was high. At the time Norway was the world's third largest oil exporter.

In 2005, oil prices reached record levels of more than 60 dollars per barrel. Although interest rates had decreased to around 2 percent, the Norwegian krone grew even stronger.

However, in late 2007 and early 2008, the dollar suffered a steady depreciation against all other major currencies. The Norwegian krone was gaining value at the same time; as a result, the krone became stronger than ever compared to the dollar, making the dollar worth about 5 kroner in April 2008. By October 2008, the dollar had recovered and was worth approximately 7 kroner. Following 2009, the krone once again saw strong growth, making the dollar worth about 5.8 kroner as of the beginning of 2010.

Since the mid-2010s, the Norwegian krone has been slowly but steadily weakening against most currencies. This presents a mystery, as Norway's economy has been strong and growing, and the decline cannot be fully explained by either oil price changes or interest rate differences between countries. However, as of 2024, the krone is still overvalued based on the Big Mac Index.

=== Current NOK exchange rates ===
From Google Finance:	AUD CAD CHF CNY EUR GBP HKD JPY USD DKK SEK
From Yahoo! Finance:	AUD CAD CHF CNY EUR GBP HKD JPY USD DKK SEK
From XE.com:	AUD CAD CHF CNY EUR GBP HKD JPY USD DKK SEK
From OANDA:	AUD CAD CHF CNY EUR GBP HKD JPY USD DKK SEK

== See also ==
- Danish krone
- Economy of Norway
- Estonian kroon
- Gold reserves of Norway
- Icelandic króna
- Scandinavian Monetary Union
- Swedish krona
