= Big Maple Leaf =

Canadian $1 million gold coin

- Canada
- Value: 1000000 Canadian dollars
- Mass: 100,000 g
- Diameter: 530 mm
- Composition: 999.99/1000 gold
- Gold: 3,215 troy oz
- Years of minting: 1
- Mintage: 5

Obverse
- Design: Effigy of Queen Elizabeth II
- Designer: Susanna Blunt
- Design date: 2003

Reverse
- Design: Hand-polished stylized maple leaf
- Designer: Stanley Witten

The Big Maple Leaf (BML) is a gold coin weighing 100 kilograms (220 lb) (3,215 troy ounces) and with a face value of CA$1,000,000. A set of five of these coins was produced by the Royal Canadian Mint (RCM) in 2007, at their Ottawa facility where the first BML produced remains in storage.

The Big Maple Leaf was recognized by the Guinness World Records in 2007 not only for its status as the world's biggest gold coin but also for its unparalleled gold purity of 99.999 per cent.

On 27 March 2017, one of the coins, valued approximately US$4 million at the time, was stolen from the Bode Museum in Berlin.

As of September 2025, the market value of a single Big Maple Leaf had reached $12 million (USD).

The Big Maple Leaf remained the largest gold coin ever minted until 2011, when the 1-tonne (2,200-pound) Australian Gold Nugget ("Gold Kangaroo") was minted.

== Description ==
A Big Maple Leaf measures 2.8 centimetres (1.1 in) thick and 50 centimetres (20 in) in diameter and is 99.999% pure. The obverse of the BML shows Queen Elizabeth II as she has appeared on Canadian coinage since 2003, when Susanna Blunt's design became the third iteration of the queen's effigy to appear on coinage (the others were 1965 and 1990). Blunt's design was intended to show the queen "in maturing dignity", without a tiara or crown (only one other RCM design ever had the monarch not wearing a crown). The reverse design is the stylized maple leaf by RCM artist and senior engraver Stan Witten.

== Theft of one coin ==
In the early hours of 27 March 2017, a Big Maple Leaf was stolen from the Münzkabinett (coin cabinet) of the Bode Museum in Berlin, Germany. The cabinet is known for its huge collection of coins – more than 500,000 pieces, among them more than 100,000 Greek and 50,000 Roman ones – though only a fraction of these coins are shown at exhibits.

The coin was lent to the Bode Museum in 2010 by private owner Boris Fuchsmann, and was displayed there until it was stolen.

In July 2017, police raids took place and arrests were made in connection with the theft. The suspects come from a family clan from Lebanon notorious for organised crime. Berlin Police assume that the coin was damaged during the theft when it was dropped from the train tracks onto the street.

In January 2019, a trial in a juvenile court against four suspects began. Two brothers, Ahmed and Wayci Remmo, and their cousin Wissam Remmo, all belonged to a Berlin crime family of Lebanese origin known to local police as the Remmo-Clan. The fourth person, Denis W., was a school friend of the Remmos and an employee of the Bode Museum. Denis was found guilty of advising the others on the museum's safety protocols. The trial ended in February 2020 with Ahmed and Wissam being sentenced to 4 1/2 years and Denis being sentenced to 3 years 4 months, the lenient sentencing being a result of them being relatively young (Ahmed and Wissam having been 18 and 20, respectively) during the crime. The fourth defendant, Wayci Remmo, was acquitted due to inconclusive evidence. The judge ordered the seizure of €3.4 million from the defendants.

Fuchsmann's insurance paid only 20% of the coin's value, arguing that negligence by the museum was to blame for the loss. After a lawsuit, the insurance company was ordered to pay 50% of the value.

The whereabouts of the gold coin remain unknown. Investigators do not expect to recover the coin, as they found highly pure gold dust matching the Big Maple Leaf on seized clothing and a car, and suspect the robbers may have melted the coin down and sold the gold.

=== Documentary ===
- Clangold, 2026 - docuseries, director: Jan Zabeil, beetz brothers film production, HBO
