= HNoMS Stavanger =

At least two ships of the Royal Norwegian Navy have been named HNoMS Stavanger, after the city of Stavanger:

- HNoMS Stavanger (1946), a C-class destroyer purchased from the Royal Navy in 1946 and broken up in 1967.
- HNoMS Stavanger (F303), an Oslo-class frigate launched in 1966 and expended as a target in 2001.
