= Bode Museum =

Art museum in Berlin

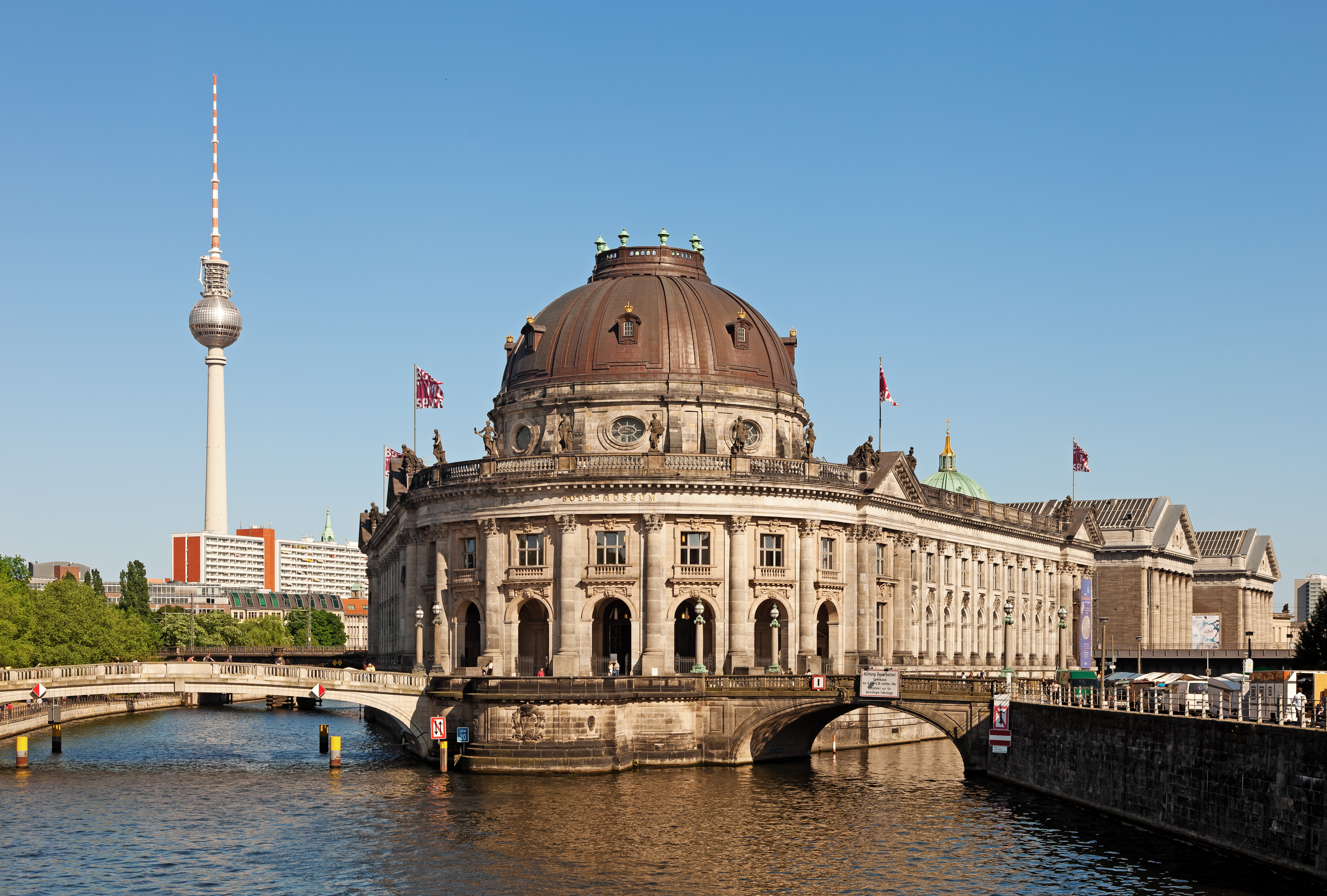
- Former name: Kaiser-Friedrich-Museum
- Established: 1904
- Location: Museum Island, Berlin
- Coordinates: 52°31′19″N 13°23′41″E
- Type: Art museum
- Website: smb.museum

UNESCO World Heritage Site
- Part of: Museumsinsel (Museum Island), Berlin
- Criteria: Cultural: ii, iv
- Reference: 896
- Inscription: 1999 (23rd Session)
- Area: 8.6 ha (21 acres)
- Buffer zone: 22.5 ha (56 acres)

The Bode Museum (German: Bode-Museum), formerly called the Emperor Frederick Museum (German: Kaiser-Friedrich-Museum), is a listed building on the Museum Island in the historic centre of Berlin. It was built from 1898 to 1904 by order of German Emperor William II according to plans by Ernst von Ihne in Baroque Revival style. The building's front square featured a memorial to German Emperor Frederick III, which was destroyed by the East German authorities. Currently, the Bode-Museum is home to the Skulpturensammlung, the Museum für Byzantinische Kunst and the Münzkabinett (sculpture, Byzantine art, and coins and medals). As part of the Museum Island complex, the Bode-Museum was inscribed on the UNESCO World Heritage List in 1999 because of its outstanding architecture and testimony to the development of museums as a cultural phenomenon in the late 19th and early 20th centuries.

== History and collections ==
Originally called the Kaiser-Friedrich-Museum after Emperor Frederick III, the museum was renamed in honor of its first curator, Wilhelm von Bode, in 1956.

During World War II, portions of the collection were stored in an antiaircraft tower called the Flakturm Friedrichshain for safe keeping. In May 1945, several fires destroyed some of the collections. In total, more than 400 paintings and about 300 sculptures were missing due to looting during the fire or destroyed in the fire itself.

Closed for repairs since 1997, the museum was reopened on 18 October 2006, after a €156 million refurbishment. True to the ethos of its founding director, Wilhelm von Bode, who believed in mixing art collections, it is now the home for a collection of sculptures, Byzantine art, and coins and medals. The presentation of the collections is both geographic and chronological, with the Byzantine and Gothic art of northern and southern Europe displayed separately on the museum's first floor and a similar regional division of Renaissance and Baroque art on its second floor.

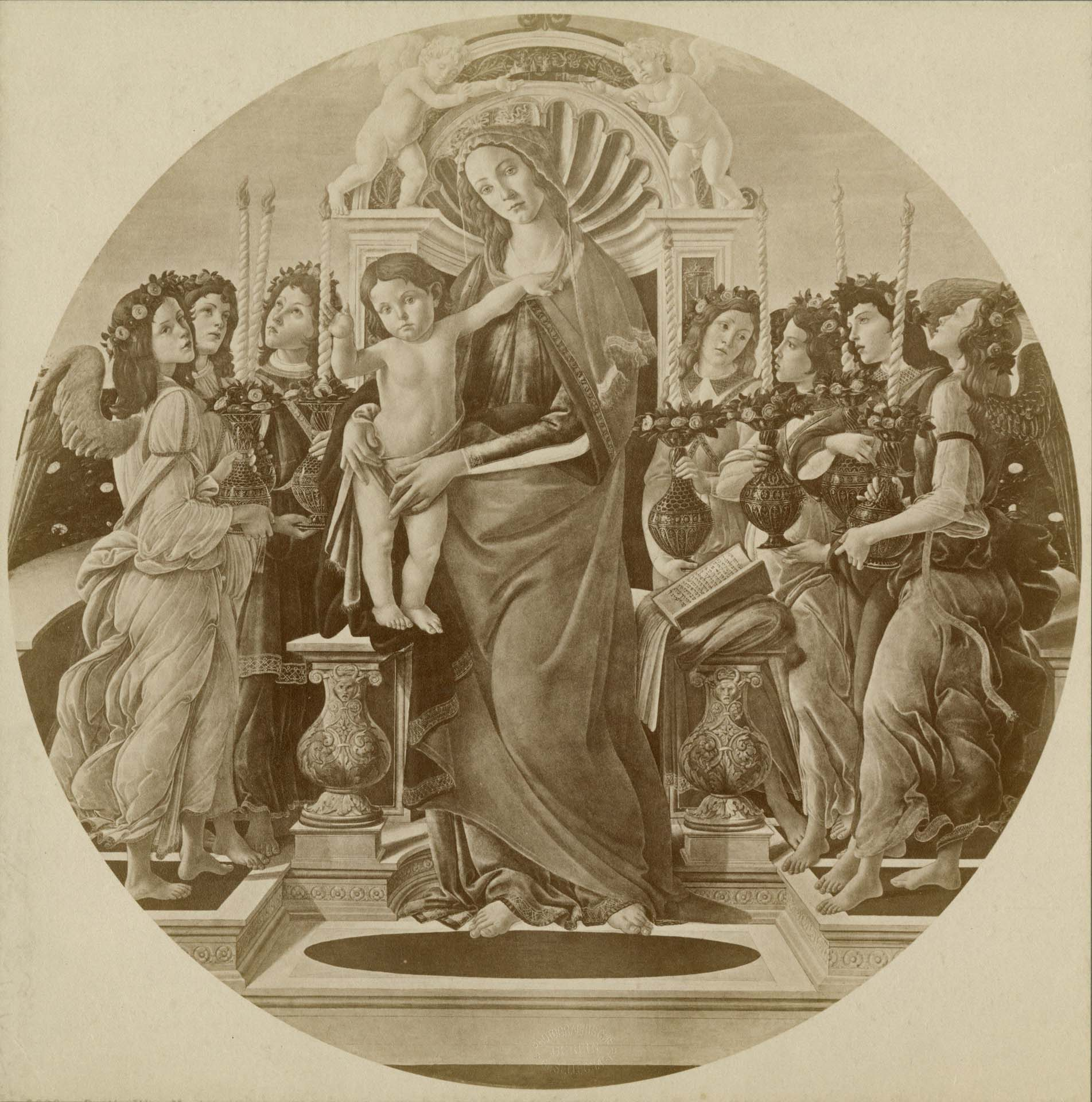
Sandro Botticelli, "Madonna and Child with Angels Carrying Candlesticks," c. 1485/1490, formerly the Kaiser Friedrich Museum, Berlin, destroyed 1945 in Flakturm Friedrichshain fire, Department of Image Collections, National Gallery of Art Library, Washington, DC

The sculpture collection displays artwork of the Christian Orient (with an emphasis on Coptic Egypt), sculptures from Byzantium and Ravenna, sculptures of the Middle Ages, the Italian Gothic, and the early Renaissance, including the controversial Flora attributed by Bode to Leonardo da Vinci but now widely argued to be a 19th-century work. Late German Gothic works are also represented by Tilman Riemenschneider, the south German Renaissance, and Prussian Baroque art up to the 18th century. In the future, selected works of the Gemäldegalerie will be integrated into the sculpture collection. This is reminiscent of William von Bode's concept of "style rooms", in which sculptures, paintings, and crafts are viewed together, as was usual in upper middle-class private collections.

The Münzkabinett ("coin cabinet") is one of the world's largest numismatic collections. Its range spans from the beginning of minting in the 7th century BC in Asia Minor up to the present day. With approximately 500,000 items, the collection is a unique archive for historical research, while its medal collection also makes it an important art exhibition.

Writing in the Financial Times on the occasion on the museum's reopening in 2006, Neil MacGregor, director of the British Museum, hailed "the most comprehensive display of European sculpture anywhere." He added: "It is no exaggeration to say that in the new Bode Museum, Europe will be able for the first time to read its history—aesthetic and religious, intellectual and political—in a three-dimensional form."

== Canadian gold coin theft ==
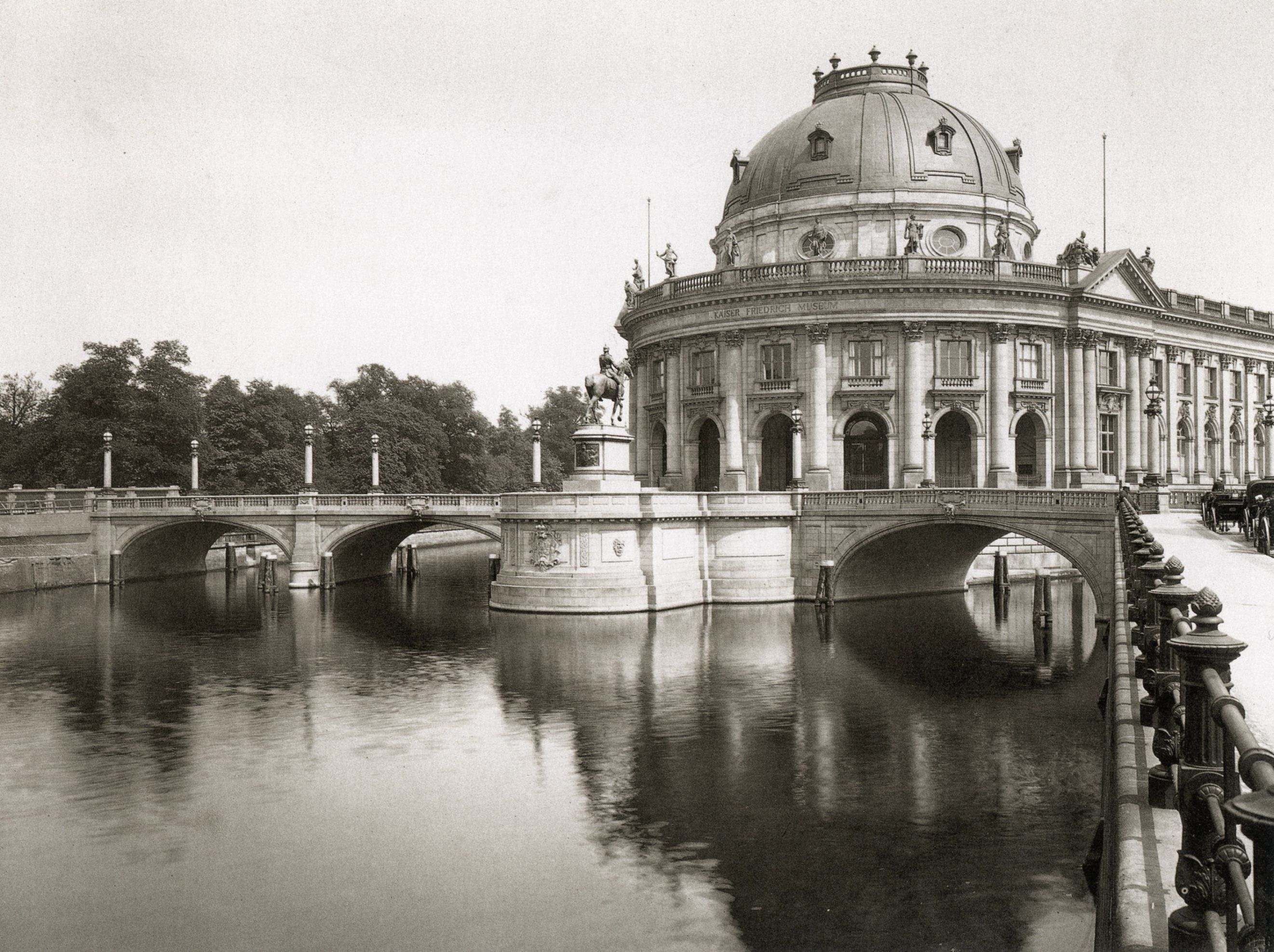
The Kaiser-Friedrich-Museum in 1904 with the memorial on the front square

On 27 March 2017, a solid gold coin called the Big Maple Leaf, issued by the Royal Canadian Mint in 2007 as a commemorative piece, was stolen from the museum. The coin, at 50 cm in diameter and 2.8 cm in thickness, is made of 24-karat gold and is worth around €3.7 million. A ladder was found on the train tracks nearby, leading German police to speculate that the thief entered the building by breaking open a window in the back of the museum next to the railway tracks.

The thieves were later found to be 21 and 23-year-old cousins Ahmed and Wissam Remmo, along with their friend, Denis W. Police do not expect to ever recover the coin, as the presence of gold dust leads them to believe the culprits had melted it down. Ahmed's brother Wayci was also charged, but later acquitted.

== See also ==
- List of art museums
- List of museums in Germany

== Gallery ==
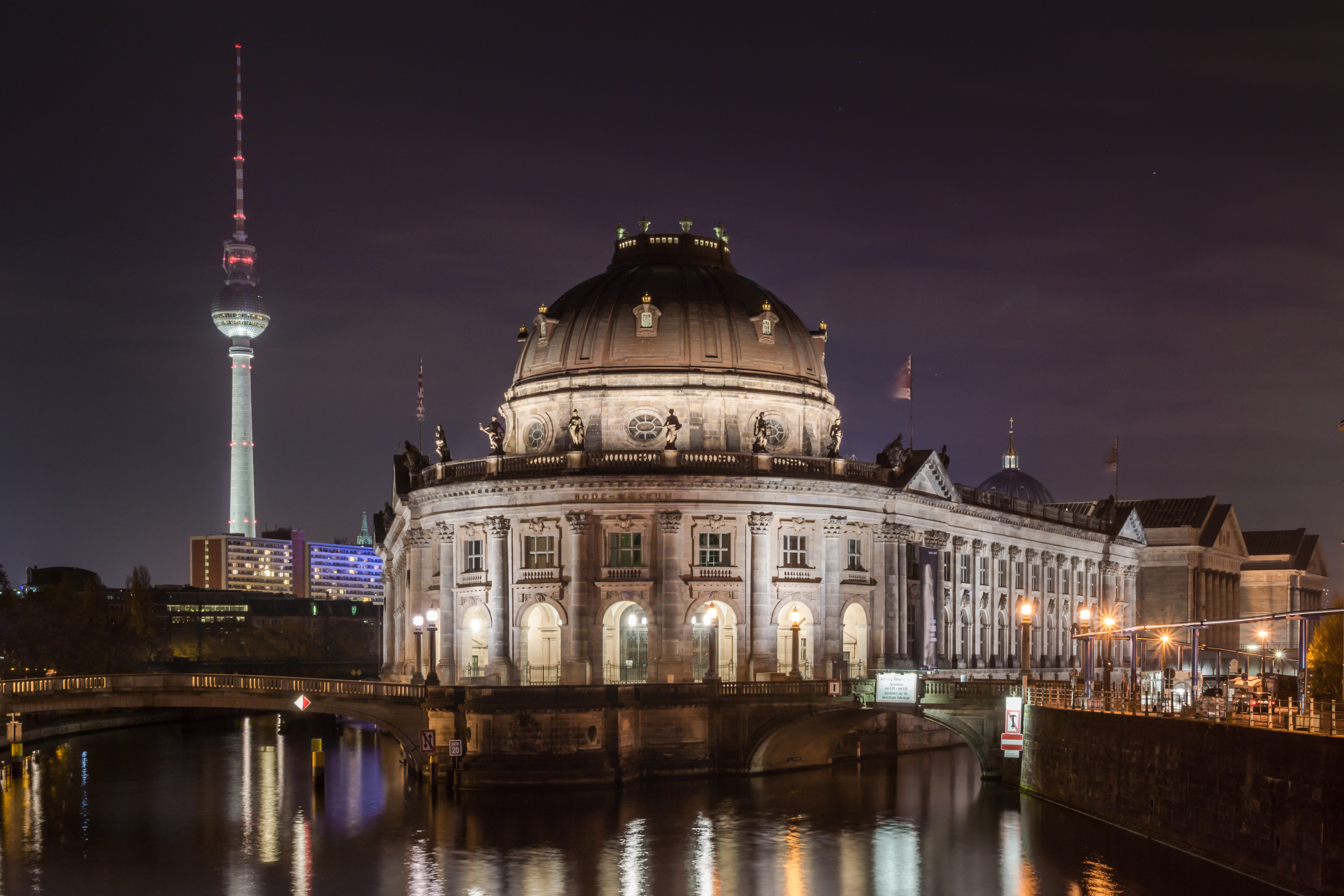
At night

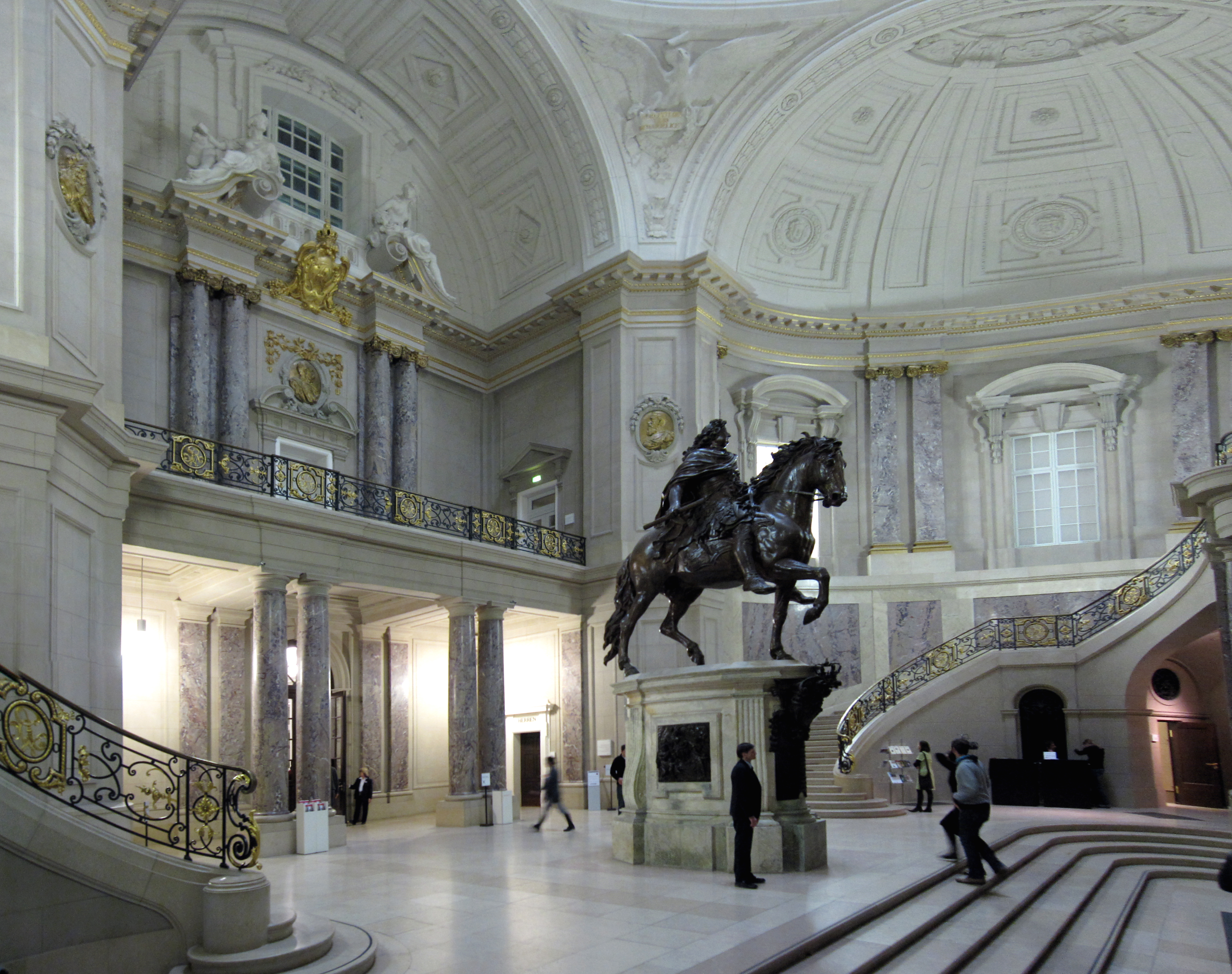
The entrance hall with a copy of the Equestrian statue of Friedrich Wilhelm I on its original base

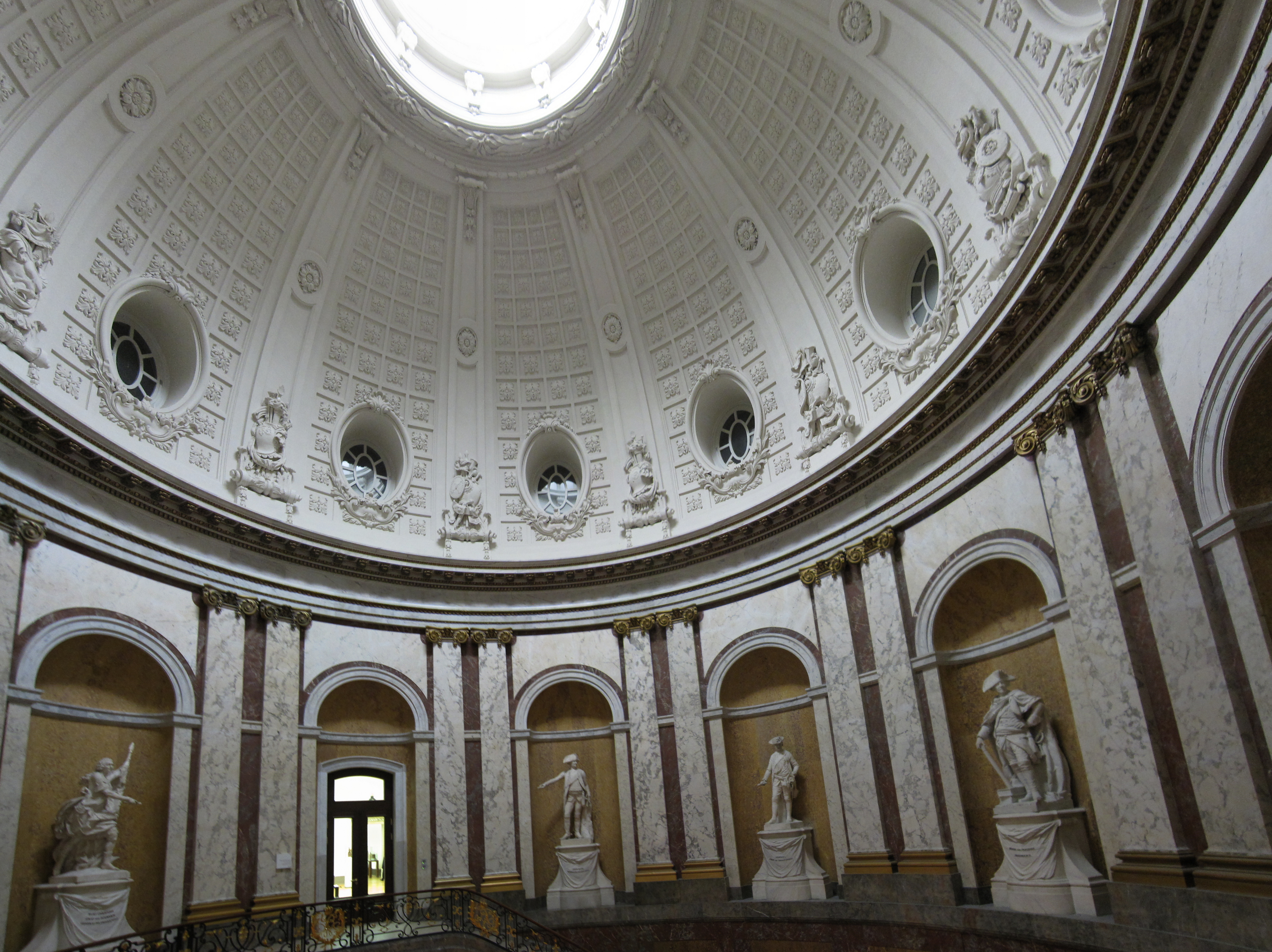
The cupola

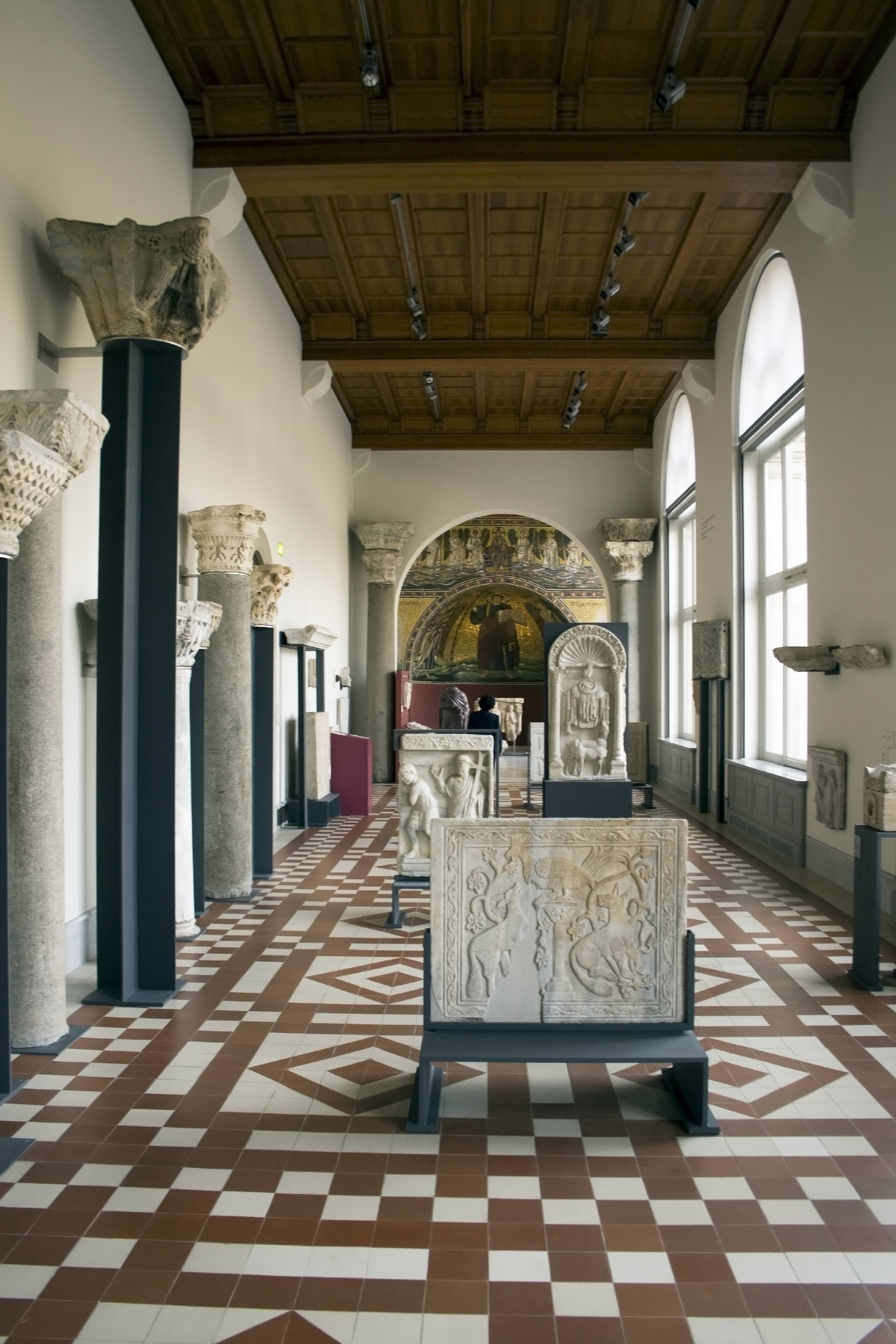
Byzantine collection

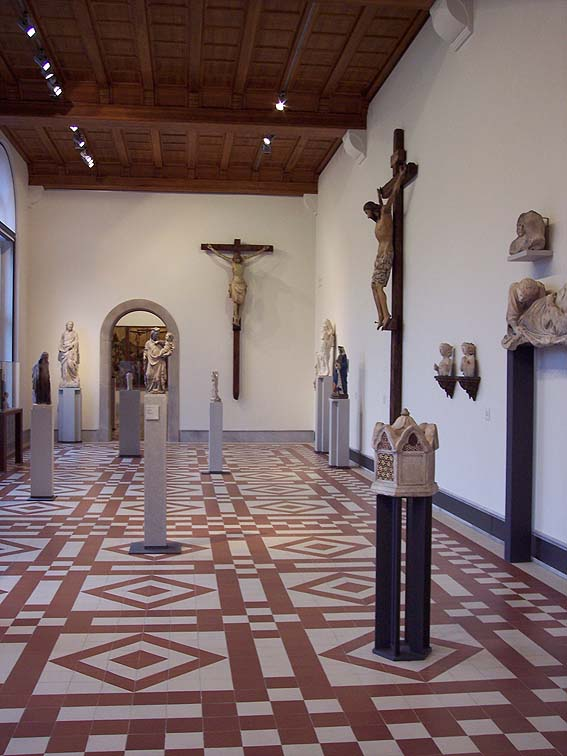
Trecento room

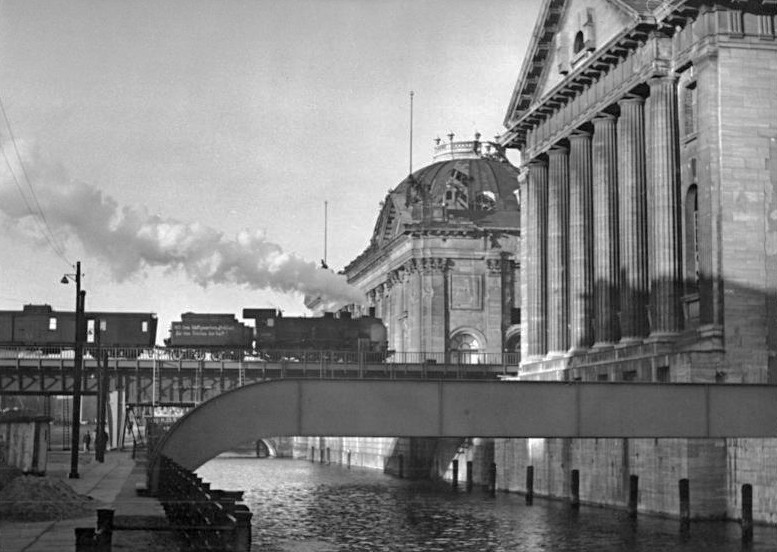
Museum Island with Pergamon Museum and Bode Museum (1951)

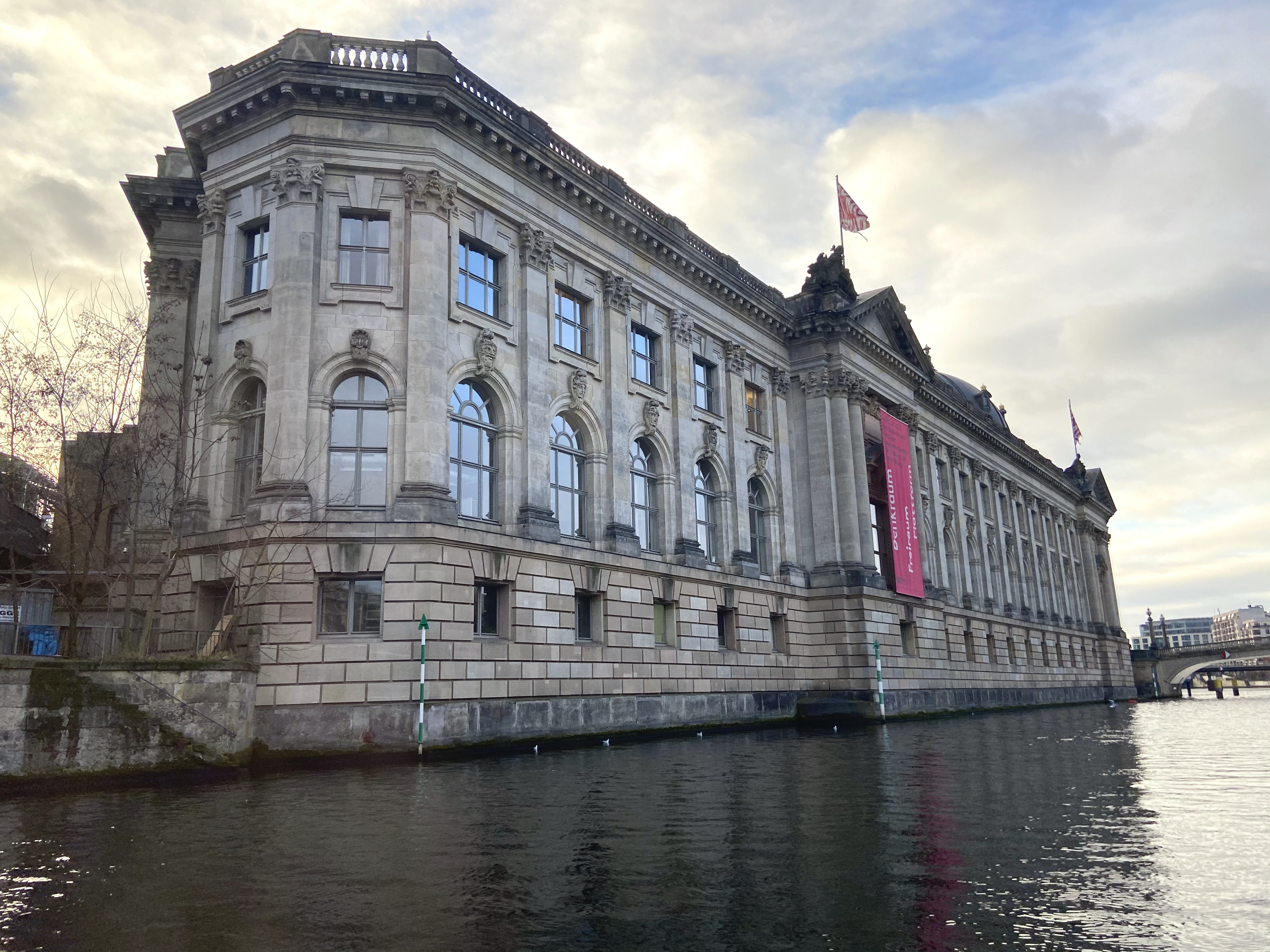
Bode-Museum, Berlin von der Spree

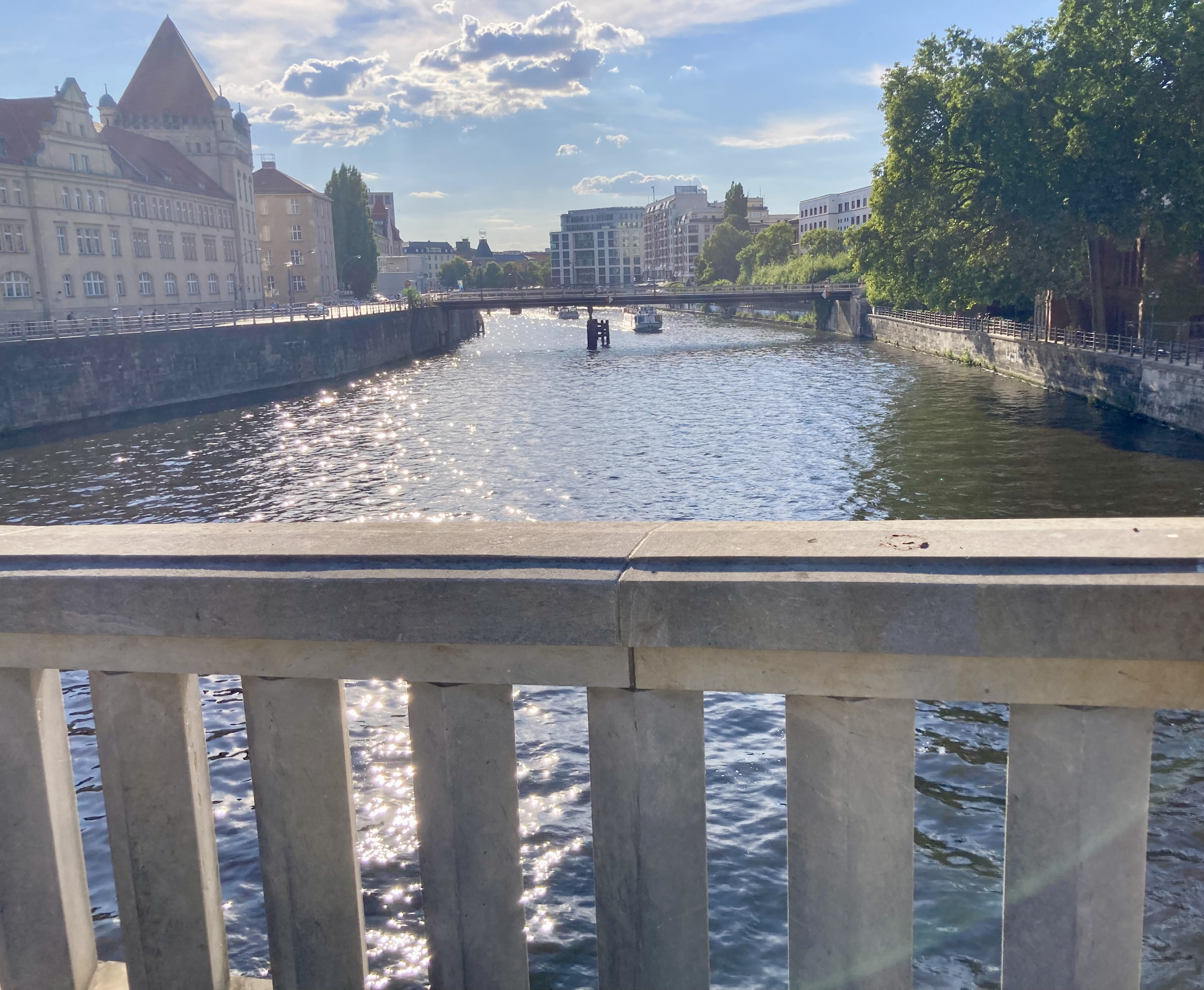
View from the Bode Museum bridge on to the river

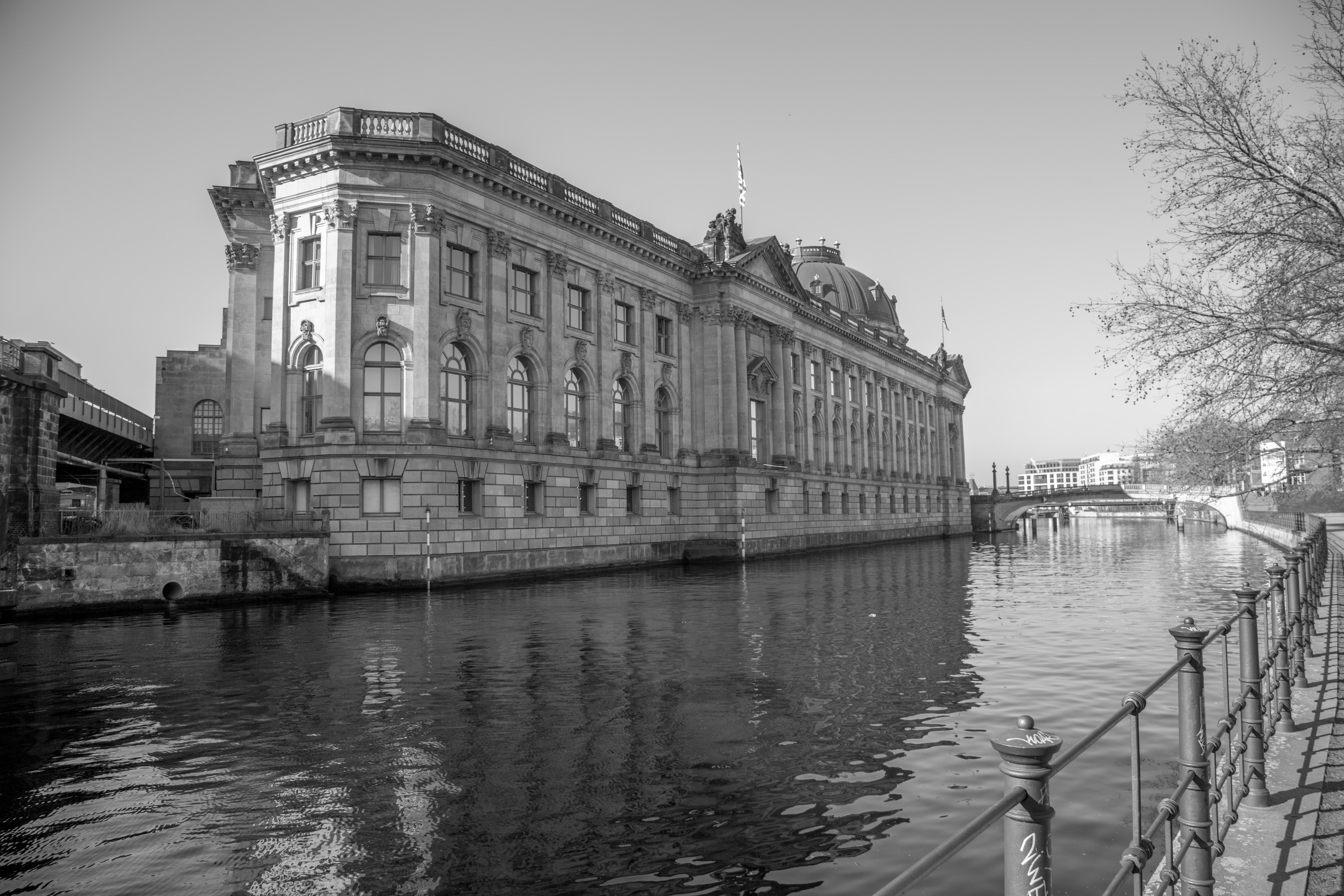
The Bode Museum, part of the ensemble of Berlin Museums located on the UNESCO listed Museum Island
