= Canadian royal symbols =

Visual and auditory identifiers of the Canadian monarchy

1958 sculpture of the Canadian coat of arms on the former Saint-Hyacinthe post office in Quebec, now a national historic site of Canada

Canadian royal symbols are the visual and auditory identifiers of the Canadian monarchy, including the viceroys, in the country's federal and provincial jurisdictions. These may specifically distinguish organizations that derive their authority from the Crown (such as parliament or police forces), establishments with royal associations, or merely be ways of expressing loyal or patriotic sentiment.

Most royal symbols in Canada are based on inherited predecessors from France, England, and Scotland, the evidence of which is still visible today, though, over time, adaptations have been made to include uniquely Canadian elements. Some representations were discarded during and after the 1970s, within an evolving Canadian identity, while others were created over the same time and continue to be up to the present. Today, symbols of the monarchy can be seen in military badges, provincial and national coats of arms, royal prefixes, monuments, and eponymous names of geographical locations and structures.

== Purpose ==
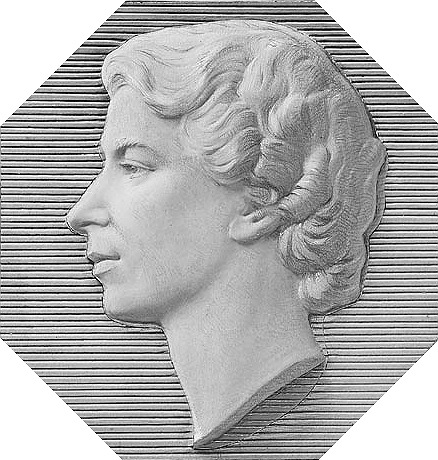
The official effigy of Elizabeth II, Queen of Canada, used in the 1950s on Canadian stamps and coins to symbolize the monarch's authority under which the post office and Royal Canadian Mint operate

The use of royal symbols developed from the first royal emblems and images of French, English, Scottish, and, later, British monarchs that were brought by colonists to New France and British North America to represent the authority of the sovereign back in Europe. The first verifiable use of a royal symbol in Canada was when Jacques Cartier raised the Royal Arms of France on the Gaspé Peninsula in 1534. Since then, some icons were created for use uniquely in the Canadas—mostly coats of arms. But, only after the First World War did growing Canadian nationalism lead to changes in the appearance and meaning to Canadians of royal symbols. Since Canada gained full legislative independence from the United Kingdom in 1931, images of the reigning monarch have been employed to signify either Canada's membership in the Commonwealth of Nations, the Crown's authority, loyalty to Canada, or Canada's full statehood.

Sean Palmer asserted in the 2018 book, The Canadian Kingdom: 150 Years of Constitutional Monarchy, that Canada and New Zealand are the two Commonwealth realms that have given the greatest attention to "the nationalization" of the visual symbols of their respective monarchies, particularly, in Canada, since the creation of the Canadian Heraldic Authority in 1988.

== Images ==
The main symbol of the monarchy is the sovereign him or herself, being described as "the personal expression of the Crown in Canada" and the personification of the Canadian state. Thus, the image of the sovereign acts as an indication of that individual's authority and therefore appears on objects created by order of the Crown-in-Council, such as coins, postage stamps, and the Great Seal of Canada. The images of English monarchs were first stuck onto coins 1,000 years ago. Through the 1800s, effigies and pictures of the monarch—Queen Victoria, especially—came to be symbolic of the wider British Empire, to which Canada belonged. As with other royal symbols, though, the general domestic meaning of the sovereign's portrait altered through the 20th century. The royal cypher is also regarded as a personal logo of the monarch, generally consisting of at least his or her initials. In Canada, the cypher has come to be indicative of the country's full sovereignty.

Many of the depictions of the sovereign and other members of the royal family, as well as some of their clothing, are part of the Crown Collection, a carried compilation of paintings, prints, sculptures, objets d'art, and furniture.

=== Coinage, banknotes, and postage ===
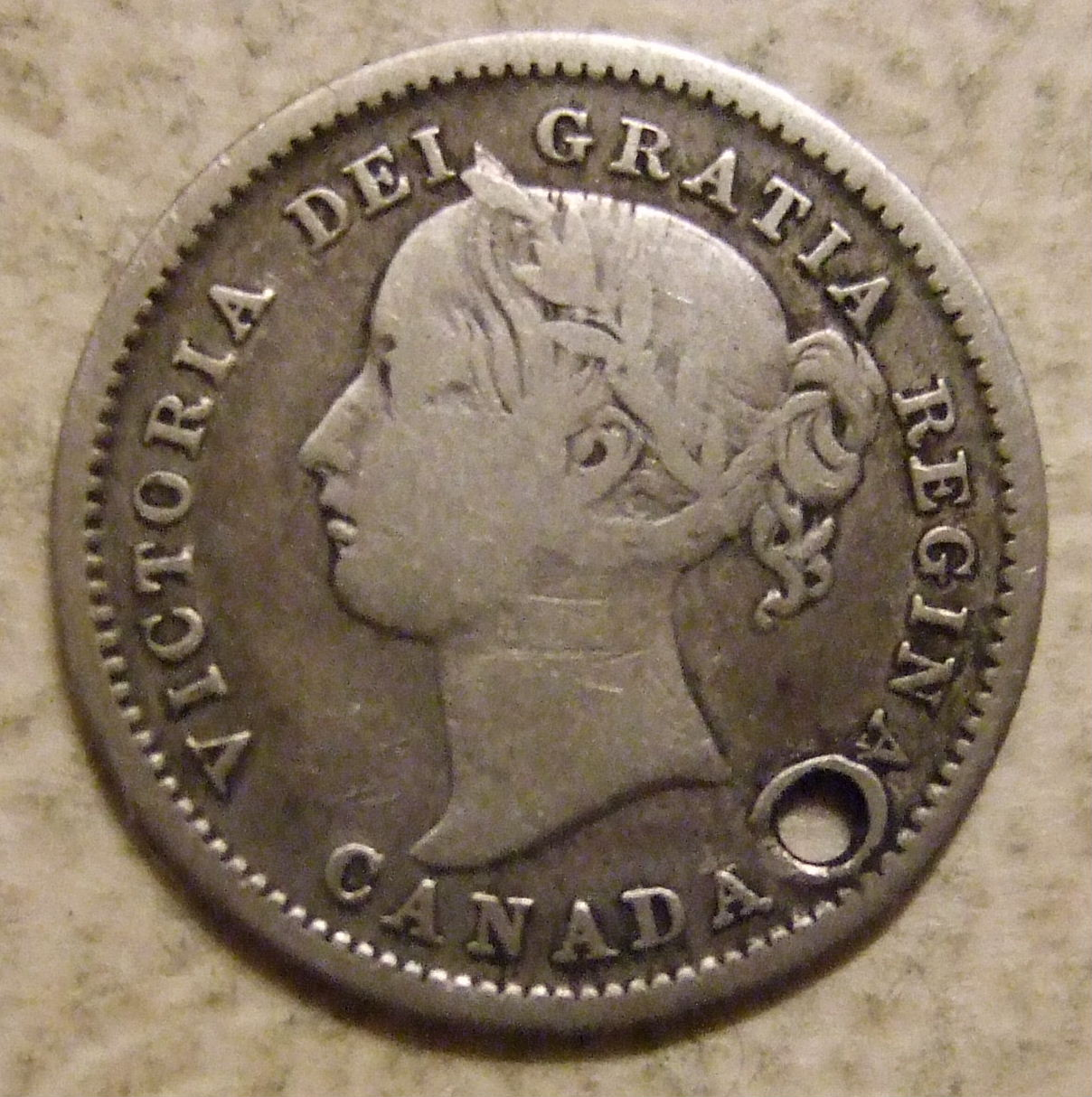
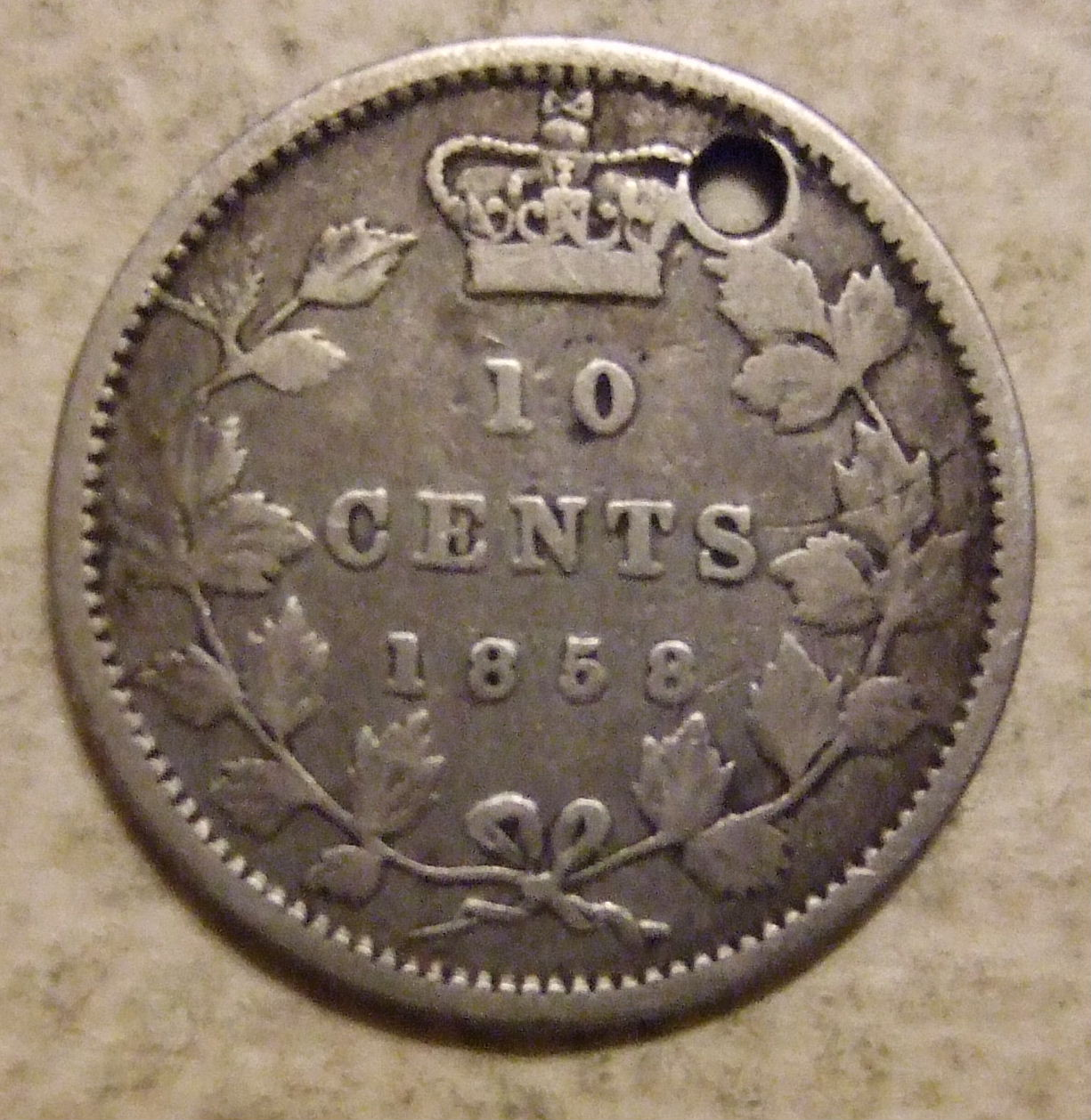
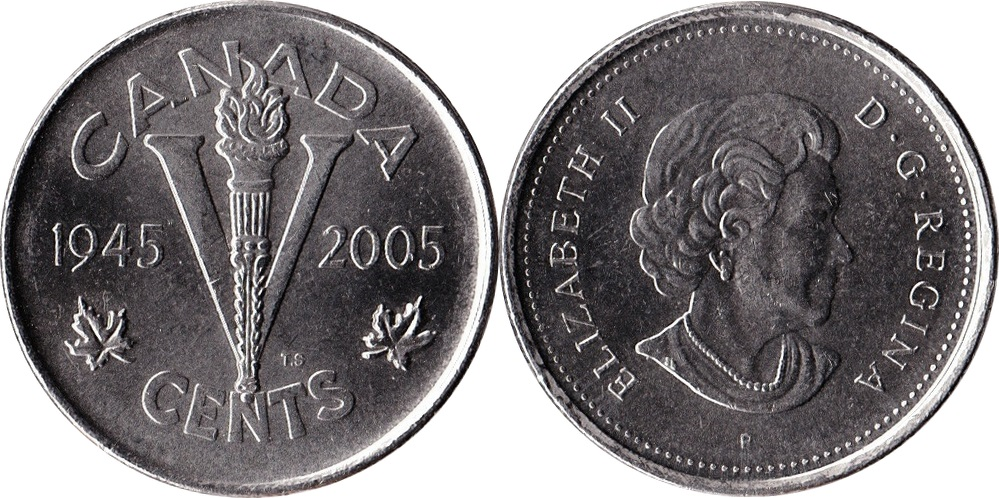
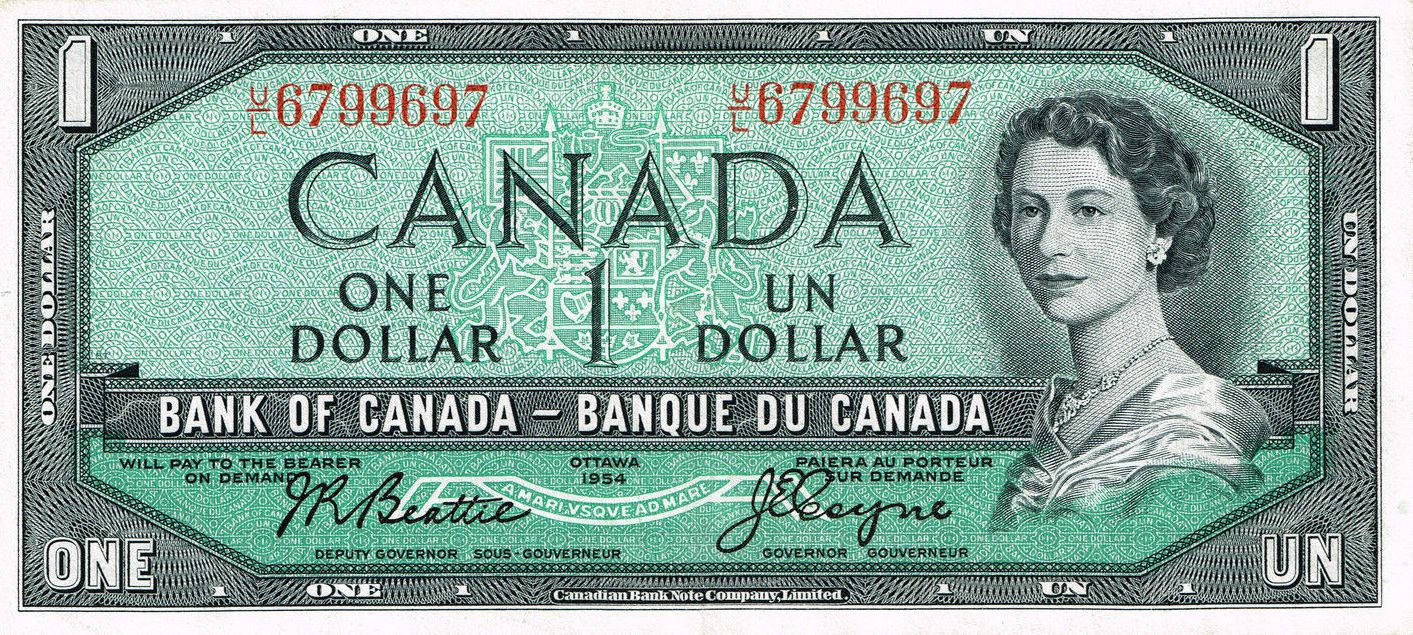
(Top to bottom) an 1858 dime featuring Queen Victoria; a "Victory" nickel from 2005, bearing the effigy of Elizabeth II created by Susanna Blunt; a one dollar banknote from 1954, depicting Elizabeth II

Coins were one of the first objects to bear the image of the reigning sovereign in what is today Canada. After 1640, French colonists employed the Louis d'or ("gold Louis", which first bore the effigy of King Louis XIII and then all subsequent French monarchs) until the transfer of New France to the British in 1763. After, British sovereigns and coppers were used, sometimes long after the end of the reign of the monarch appearing on the coin. As a result of decimalisation, the Province of Canada replaced the Canadian pound with the dollar in 1858, minting new coins whose obverse side featured an effigy of Queen Victoria; a trend that continued with the first coins issued in Canada after confederation. Since its establishment in 1908, coins minted by the Royal Canadian Mint featured an effigy of the reigning monarch. (Note: Prior to the establishment of the Royal Canadian Mint, the Canadian dollar for the Province of Canada and confederated Canada were minted by the British Royal Mint.)

Canadian coins featured effigies of the monarch that were consistent with the other Commonwealth realms until 1990. In that year, the Royal Canadian Mint opted to use an effigy of Elizabeth II designed by Dora de Pédery-Hunt, making her the first Canadian to sculpt an effigy of the Queen on coinage. Pédery-Hunt's rendition was used until 2003 when a design by Susanna Blunt took its place. After the death of Elizabeth II, Blunt's effigy remained in use until 2023, when it was replaced by Steven Rosati's rendition of Charles III.

Images of the reigning monarch and his or her family have also traditionally been printed on Canadian postage stamps since 1851, when Queen Victoria and her consort, Prince Albert, were shown on 12- and 6-pence stamps, respectively, for mail in the Province of Canada. Stamps previously issued in other British North American colonies showed images of crowns and, into the late 1800s, bore some variation of the Queen's cypher. Starting in 1939, when she was still Princess Elizabeth of York, Queen Elizabeth II was depicted in 59 successive stamp designs in Canada, continuing on to the Queen Elizabeth II definitive stamps released in the 2000s.

=== Artworks ===
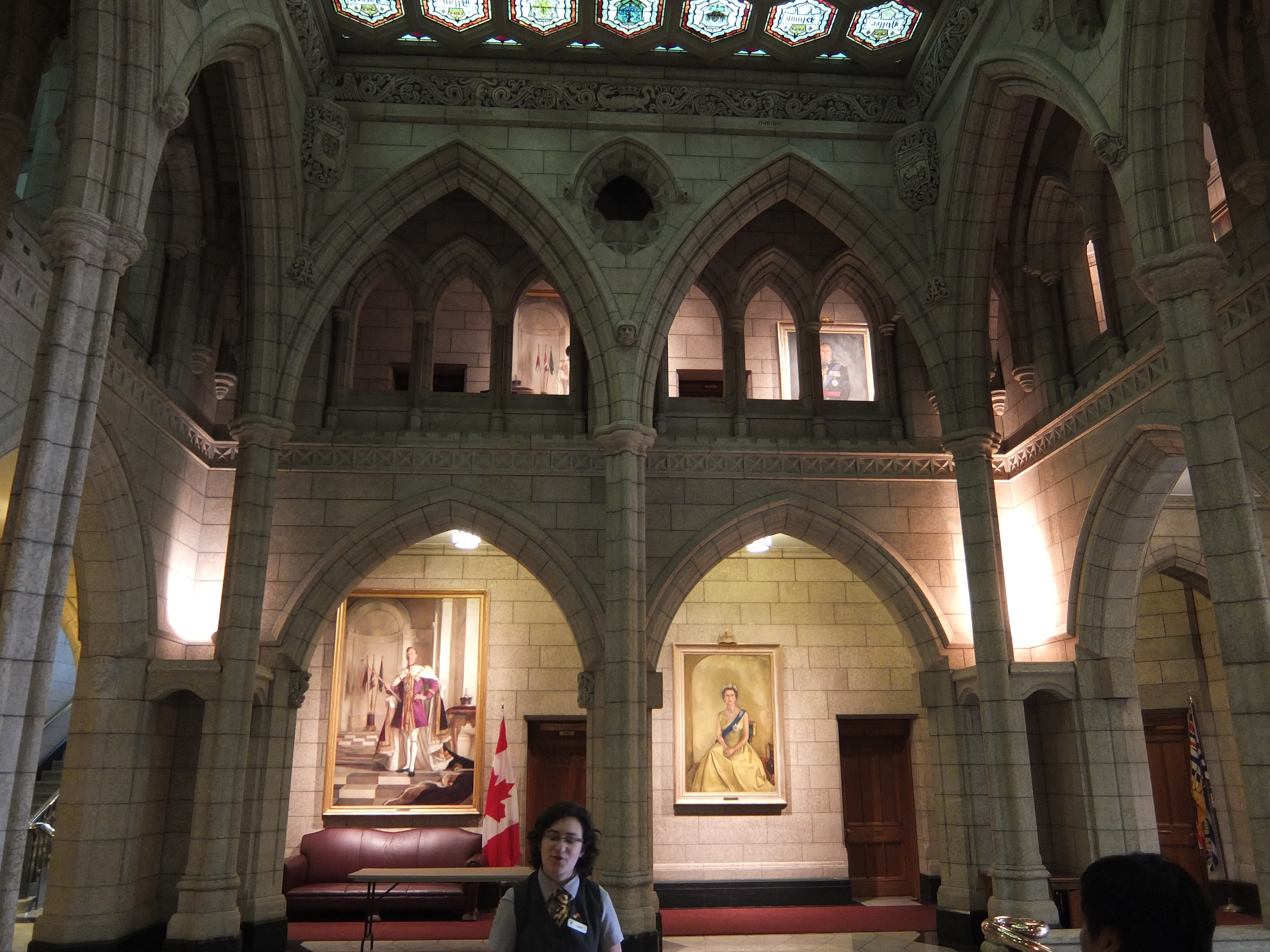
Portraits of King George VI and his daughter, Queen Elizabeth II, in the Senate foyer in the Centre Block of the federal Parliament

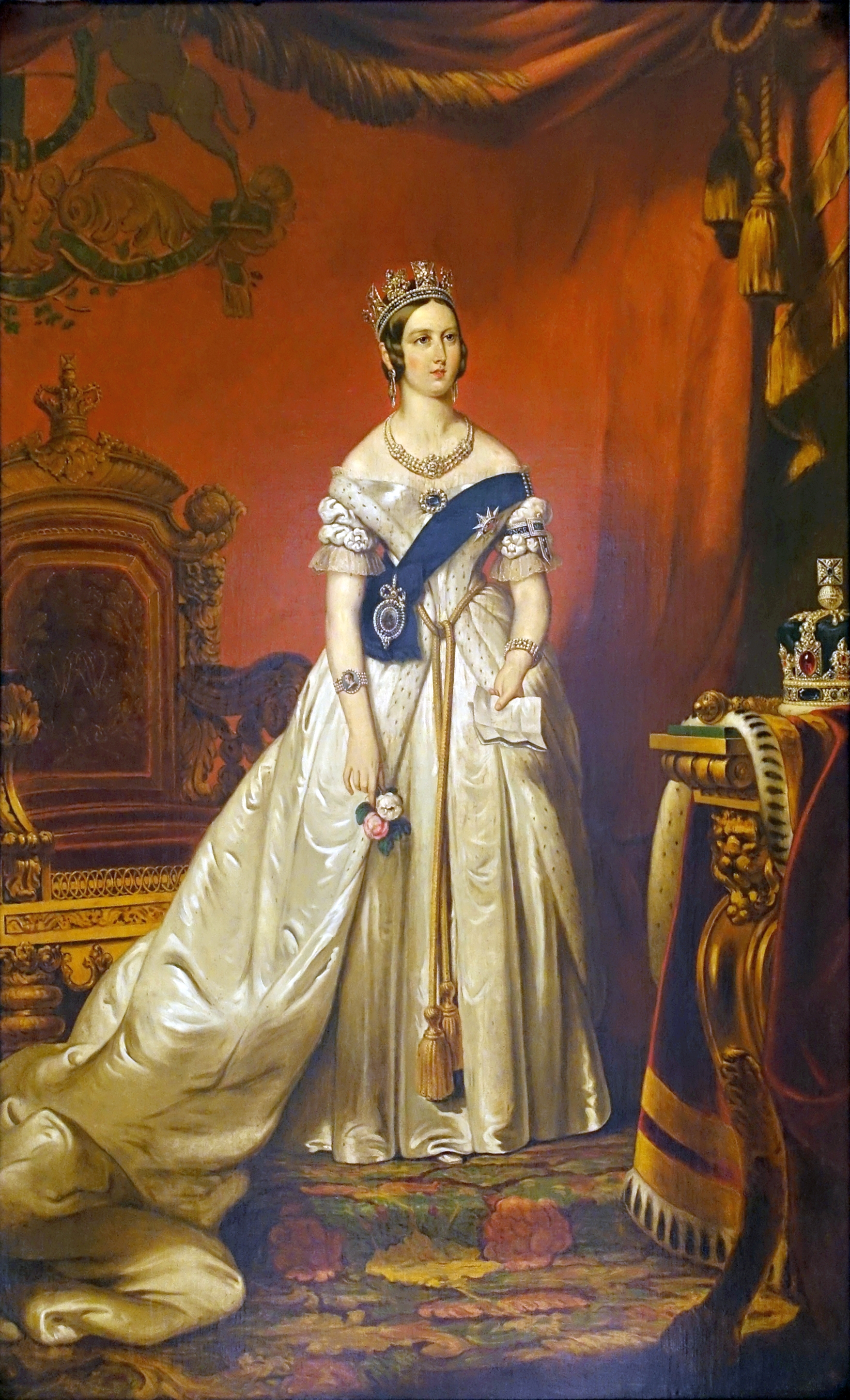
A copy of the John Partridge portrait of Queen Victoria, in Osgoode Hall, Toronto

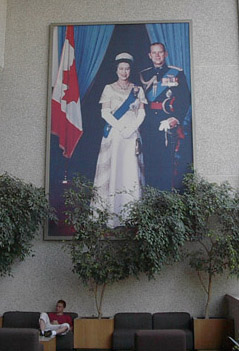
A 1977 portrait of Queen Elizabeth II and Prince Philip, Duke of Edinburgh, in a courthouse

The monarchs of Canada have been portrayed by Canadian and European artists in paint, sculpture, and photography. Formal likenesses of the monarch are commissioned by relevant official bodies, such as crowns-in-council or parliaments, and are often found inside or outside government buildings, military installations, many schools, and Canada's high commissions and embassies abroad, as well as in parks and other public places. A full collection of official portraits of sovereigns of Canada and its predecessor territories going back to King Francis I was amassed by Senator Serge Joyal and are on display in the Senate foyer and Salon de la Francophonie in the parliament buildings' Centre Block.

One of these is the portrait of Queen Victoria painted by John Partridge, which was created in the United Kingdom and shipped to Canada in the early 1840s. It was rescued from four fires, including the burning of the parliament of the Province of Canada in 1849 and the great fire that destroyed the Centre Block in 1916. During the latter event, parliamentary staff, desperately trying to save as much artwork as they could, found the portrait of Victoria was too large to fit through the door. They, thus, quickly cut it out of its frame and rolled it up. As a consequence, a cut through the crown can be seen today in the painting, which hangs in the Senate foyer.

An official painted portrait of Queen Elizabeth II was created in 1976, and another by Scarborough, Ontario, artist Phil Richards was completed in 2012 mark the monarch's Diamond Jubilee. The latter image depicts Elizabeth wearing her insignia as Sovereign of the Order of Canada and Order of Military Merit and standing in Rideau Hall beside a desk upon which is a copy of the Constitution Act, 1867 (granted royal assent by Queen Victoria and patriated by Queen Elizabeth), and a vase embossed with the Canadian Diamond Jubilee emblem; behind the Queen is the Canadian national flag and George Hayter's 1837 state portrait of Victoria. The creation of this portrait is the subject of a National Film Board of Canada (NFB) documentary directed by Hubert Davis, which was released in fall 2012 as part of the NFB's Queen's Diamond Jubilee Collector's Edition. The painting was on 25 June installed in the ballroom at Rideau Hall.

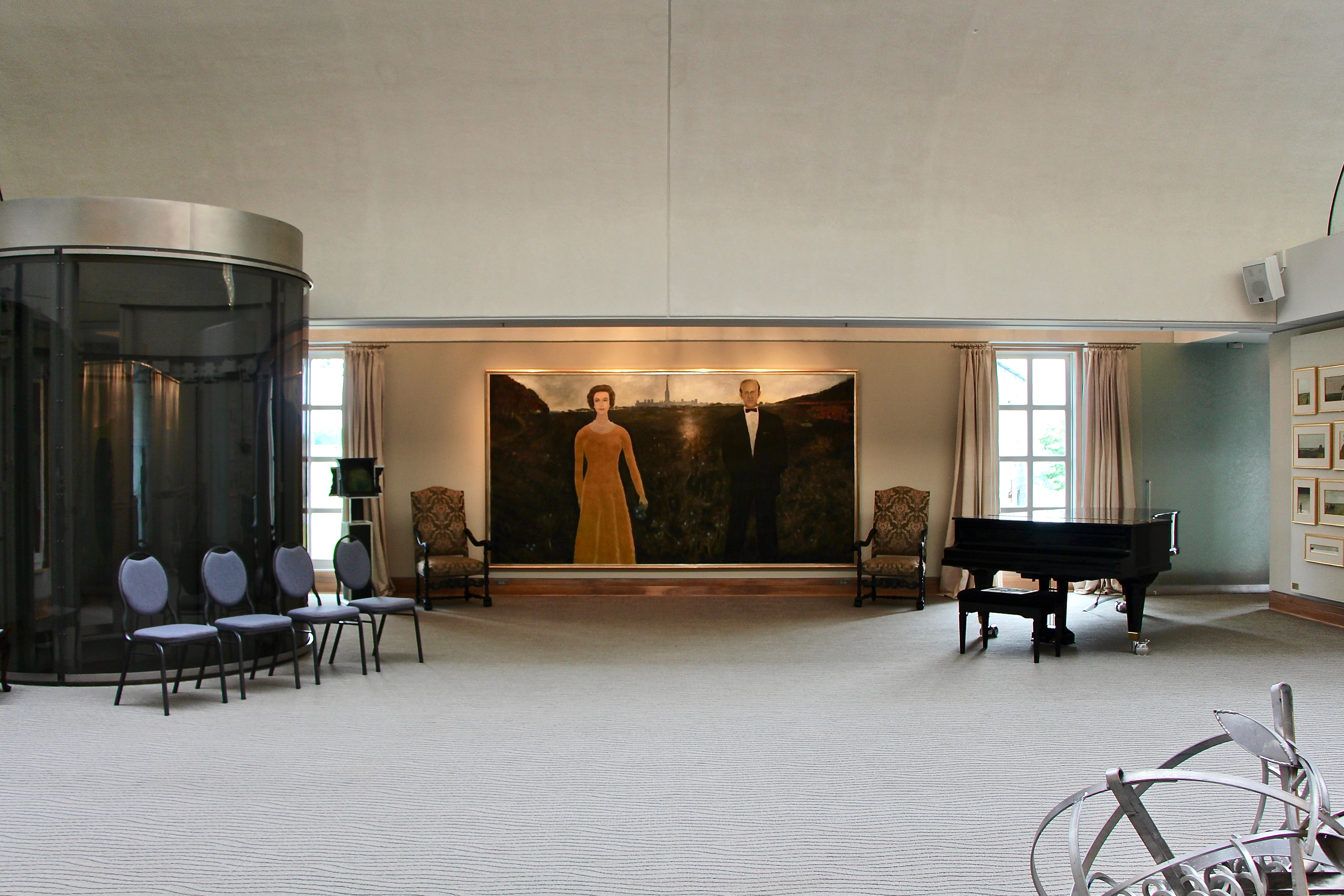
Jean Paul Lemieux's 1979 work affectionate memory images, in the monarch's and governor general's residence at la Citadelle, in Quebec City

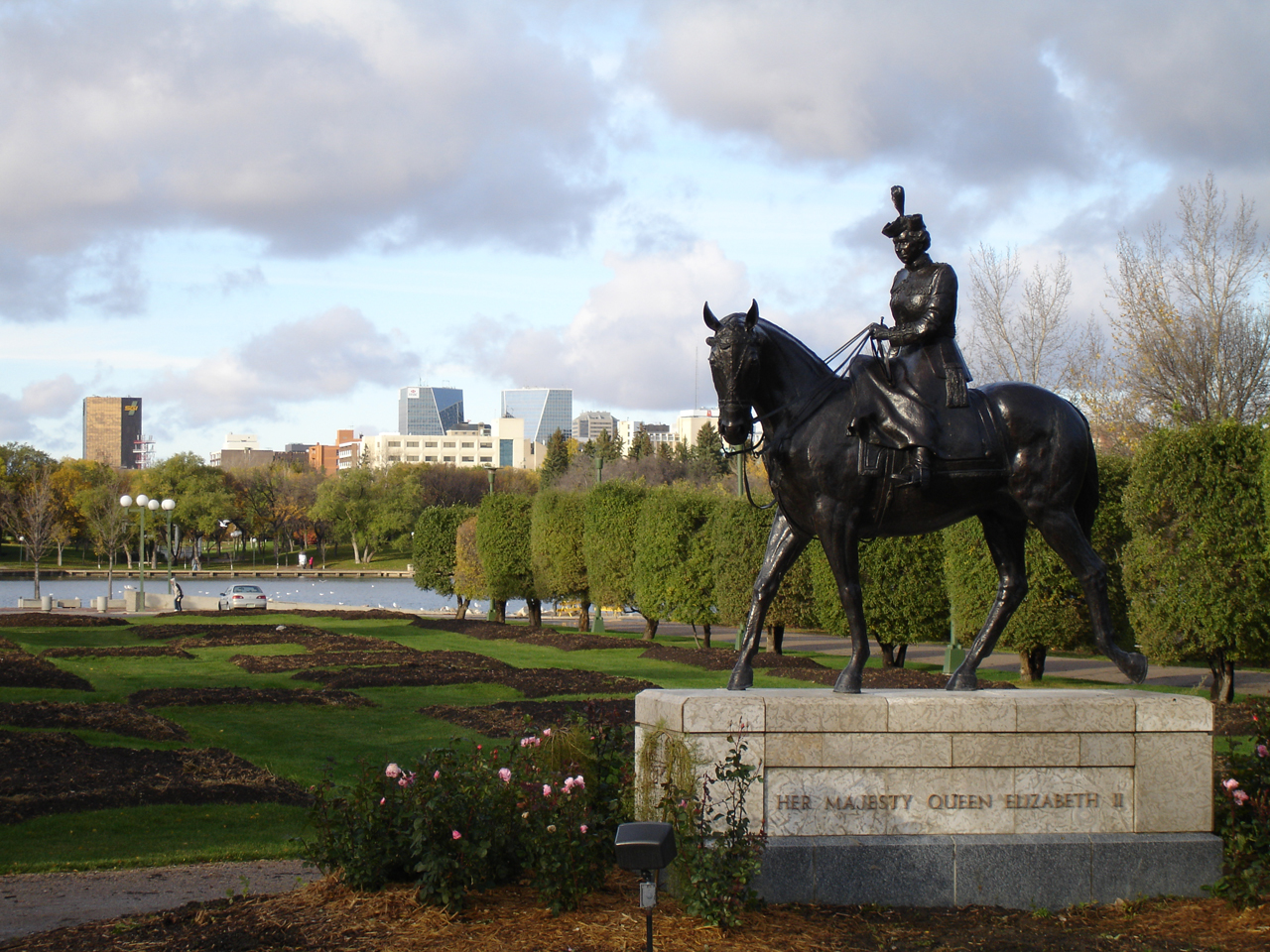
The statue of Elizabeth II outside the Saskatchewan Legislative Building

Elizabeth II was also the subject of Canadian painters, including Jean Paul Lemieux, whose 1979 work affectionate memory images combines "the familiar and the constitutional" by portraying the Queen and the Duke of Edinburgh in a meadow in front of the Canadian parliament buildings.

More formal and enduring are the sculptures of some of Canada's monarchs, such as Louis-Philippe Hébert's bronze statue of Queen Victoria that was in 1901 unveiled on Parliament Hill in Ottawa. Jack Harmon of British Columbia created in 1992 the equestrian statue of Queen Elizabeth II that also stands on Parliament Hill, and sculptor Susan Velder fashioned in June 2003 another such statue for the grounds of the Saskatchewan Legislative Building.

Queen Elizabeth II posed for a number of Canada's prominent photographers, the first being Yousuf Karsh, who made a formal portrait of Elizabeth when she was a 17-year-old princess and, later, took a series of official pictures of the princess, in formal and informal poses, just months before she acceded to the throne. Karsh was commissioned on two subsequent occasions to create series of pictures of the Queen and the Duke of Edinburgh, once prior to Elizabeth's 1967 tour of Canada for the centenary of Canada's confederation, when he photographed the royal couple at Buckingham Palace, and again in 1984, creating a set of portraits that included a shot of the Queen with her corgi, Shadow. Prior to her second tour of Canada as queen in 1959, Elizabeth requested that a Canadian photographer take her pre-tour pictures and Donald McKeague of Toronto was selected. Then, in 1973, Onnig Cavoukian, also from Toronto, made a photographic portrait that was dubbed "The Citizen Queen" because of the informal way in which Elizabeth was depicted. Rideau Hall photographer John Evans captured the sovereign on film in 1977, during her Silver Jubilee stay in Ottawa; Evans portrayed the Queen following her return from opening parliament. More recently, photographic portraits of Queen Elizabeth II were made in 2002, as part of her Golden Jubilee celebrations, and in 2005, when she marked the centenaries of Alberta and Saskatchewan.

The Queen's Beasts were created by James Woodford for the coronation of Queen Elizabeth II in 1953 and based on the King's Beasts, originally made for Hampton Court Palace, near London, on the order of King Henry VIII. Though commissioned by the British Ministry of Works, the Queen's Beasts are now in the collection of the Canadian Museum of History in Ottawa, having been given to the Canadian Crown-in-Council in 1958.

=== Clothing and jewellery ===
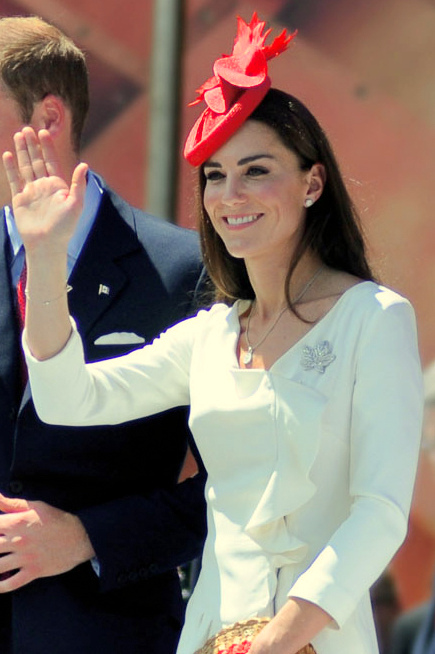
Catherine, Duchess of Cambridge, in Ottawa, on Canada Day 2011, wearing clothing in the national colours of Canada, including a maple leaf fascinator, and the Maple Leaf Brooch given by King George VI to Queen Elizabeth (later the Queen Mother) in 1939

In the role of the state personified, the monarch has worn clothing symbolic of the country and his or her distinct role in it. For instance, the gown worn by Queen Elizabeth II at both her coronation in London and the opening of the Canadian parliament in 1957 was decorated with the floral emblems of her realms, including maple leaves for Canada. During the same 1957 visit to Ottawa, the Queen also wore to a banquet held at Rideau Hall the Maple-Leaf-of-Canada dress; it was a pale green satin gown, edged with a garland consisting of deep green velvet maple leaves appliquéd with crystals and emeralds. Afterwards, the dress was donated to the Crown Collection and is now held at the Canadian Museum of History. Similarly, for a dinner held in July 2010 in Toronto, Elizabeth wore a white gown with silver maple leaves appliquéd on the right sleeve and shoulder. Occasionally, she wore clothing designed with Aboriginal motifs or materials made by some of the First Nations peoples. For the opening of parliament in 1977, the Queen wore a gown with gold fringes that was suggestive of an aboriginal princess and, in 2010, wore in Nova Scotia a coat trimmed with beads made by women of the Mi'kmaq nation.

The monarch also owns various jewellery pieces that are distinctively Canadian, such as two maple leaf brooches. The diamond Maple Leaf Brooch was originally owned by Queen Elizabeth, given to her by her husband, King George VI, in advance of their tour of Canada in 1939. The Queen subsequently lent it to her daughter, Princess Elizabeth, Duchess of Edinburgh, for her 1951 tour of Canada. The younger Elizabeth inherited the brooch upon becoming queen in 1952 and continued to wear it while in Canada or, for instance, sitting for an official Canadian portrait. She also lent the jewellery piece to the Duchess of Cornwall (now the Queen) and the Duchess of Cambridge (now the Princess of Wales) for their tours of Canada.

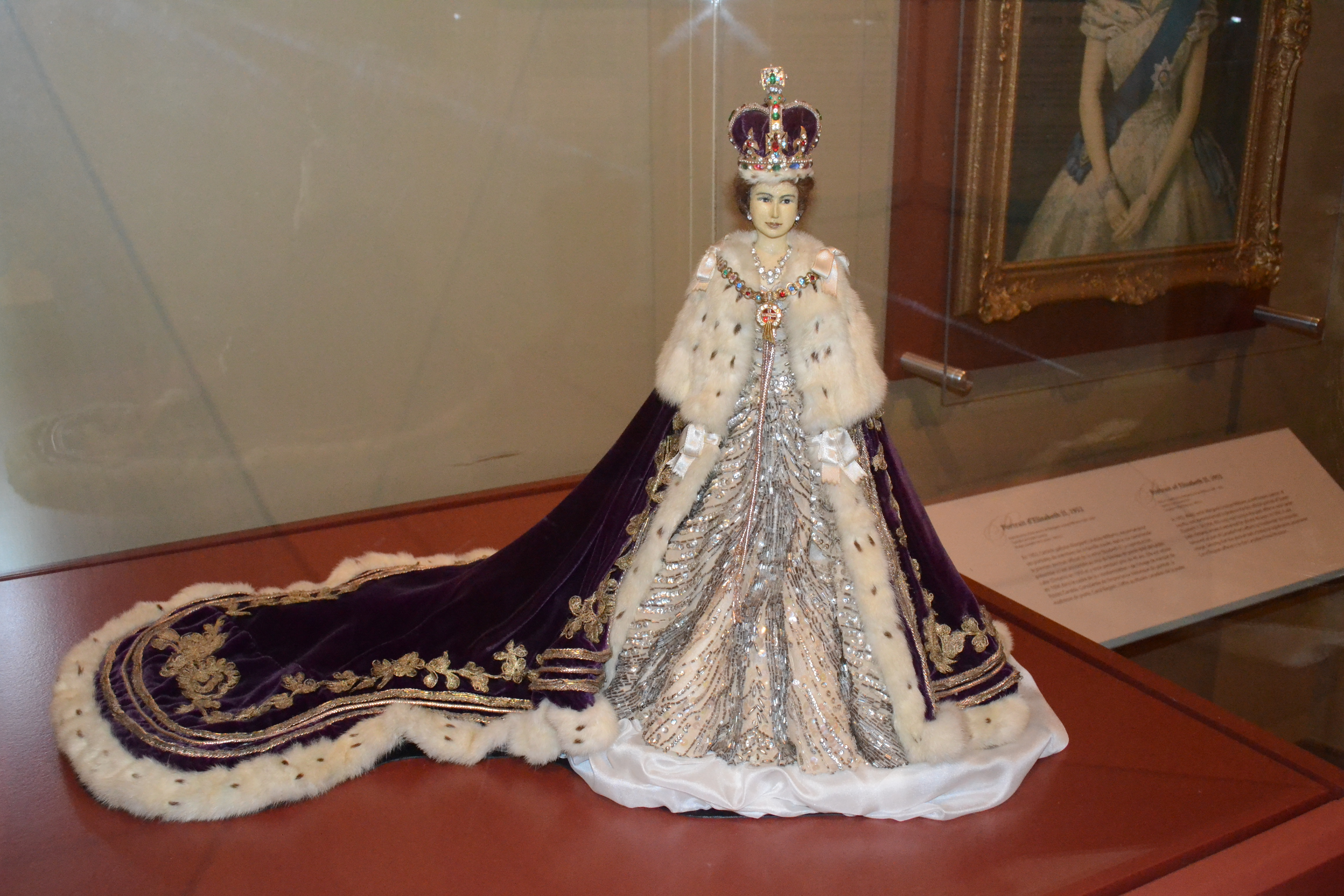
A model of Queen Elizabeth II in her coronation gown and regalia on display at the Canadian Museum of History, as part of the show A Queen and Her Country, to mark the Queen's Diamond Jubilee

To mark Queen Elizabeth II's 65th year as Queen of Canada and the 150th anniversary of Canadian Confederation, Governor General David Johnston presented the Queen, at Canada House, with the Sapphire Jubilee Snowflake Brooch. Designed as a companion to the diamond Maple Leaf Brooch, the piece was made by Hillberg and Berk of Saskatchewan and consists of sapphires from a cache found in 2002 on Baffin Island by brothers Seemeega and Nowdluk Aqpik.

The Saskatchewan Tourmaline Brooch was also made by Hillberg and Berk and gifted to the Queen in 2013 by the Lieutenant Governor of Saskatchewan, Vaughn Solomon Schofield. It has an asymmetrical geometric floral design and is made of white gold set with Madagascar tourmalines, diamonds, and a single freshwater pearl.

The government of the Northwest Territories had the Polar Bear Brooch made for the then-Duchess of Cambridge and matching cufflinks for the then-Duke of Cambridge, in 2011. Created by Harry Winston, the brooch features 4.5 carats (0.90 g) of pavé-set diamonds in platinum; 302 diamonds in total, all mined at the local Diavik Diamond Mine. The cufflinks consist of 390 diamonds, weighing 2.48 carats (0.496 g) total.

== Crown ==
Canada does not have its own physical crown. When King George VI gave royal assent in parliament, he wore a cocked hat and, when Queen Elizabeth II opened parliament in 1957 and 1977, she wore one of her tiaras: the Kokoshnik Tiara. Between 2007 and 2011, efforts were made to have a unique Canadian crown created in time for Elizabeth II's Diamond Jubilee in 2012. This would have been manufactured using Canadian precious metals (platinum, gold, and silver) and encrusted with gems and semi-precious stones sourced from Canada and other Commonwealth countries, all donated and gifted to the monarch. Heraldic renderings were produced by Gordon Macpherson showing three proposed designs and the process reached the stage of rough technical drawings for a jeweller. However, after Canadian officials consulted again with the Queen, she halted the project.

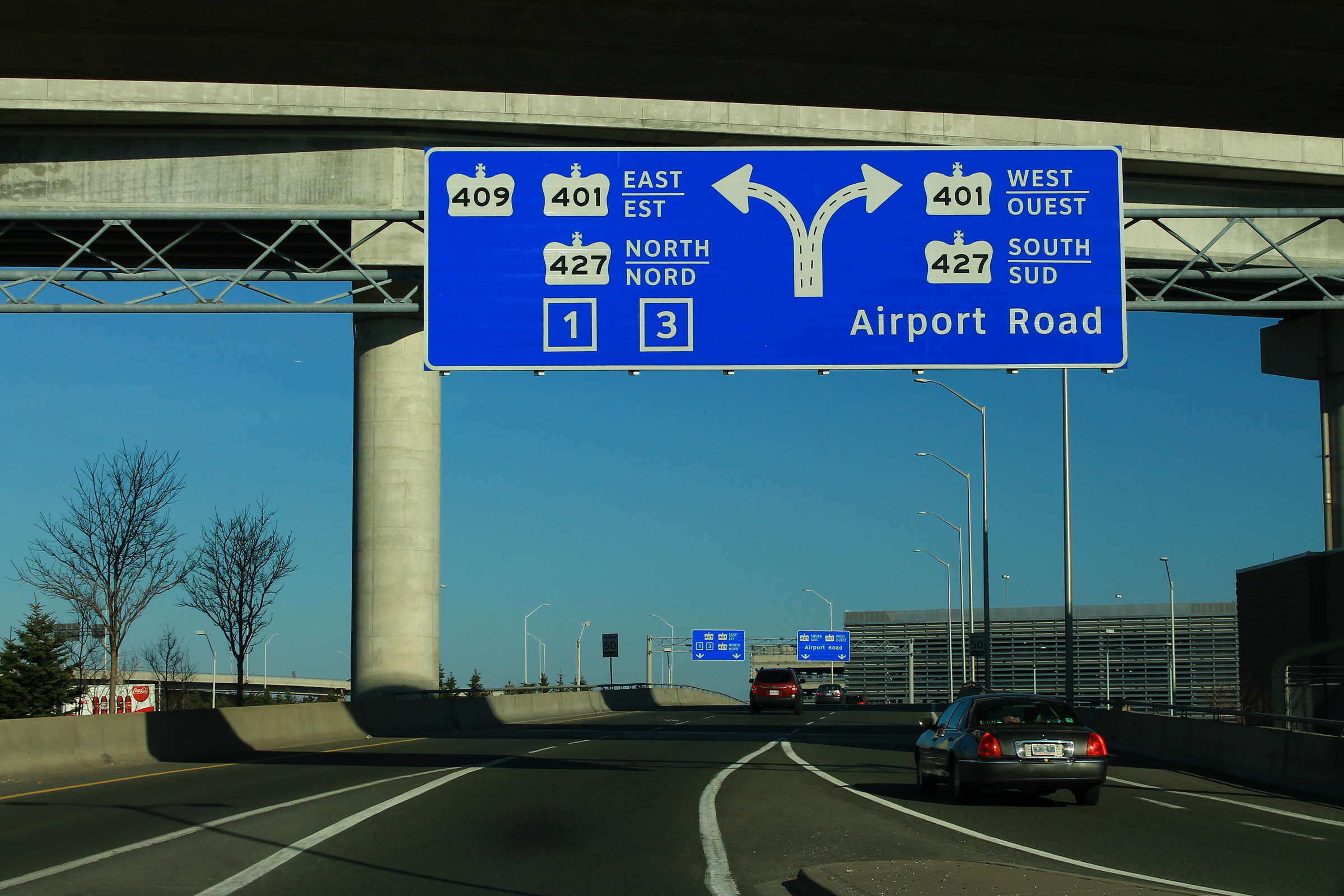
Highway shields in Ontario are typically shaped after St Edward's Crown

As a heraldic device, the crown is prevalent across Canada, being incorporated into a multitude of other emblems and insignia. On the most basic level, the crown itself is a visual reminder of the monarchy, its central place as the fuse between all branches of government, and its embodiment of the continuity of the state. As Canada is a constitutional monarchy with responsible government, the crown can also symbolise "the sovereignty (or authority) of the people."

It can be found on, amongst others, the Royal Cypher; the Royal Arms of Canada; some of the provincial and territorial coats of arms; the badges of the Royal Canadian Mounted Police; and those of the Canadian Forces, the Canadian Coast Guard, and several other badges of federal departments. A crown may also be found atop signs in Ontario for the King's Highways and the Queen Elizabeth Way. A crown is also present on various Canadian decorations and medals, as well as the insignia for all the country's orders, reflecting the monarch's place as the fount of honour. The crown may exist on a medallion as a part of the Royal Cypher and/or on the sovereign's head in effigy, though it can also be placed atop the medal of badge of an order. Use of the royal crowns in any design requires the consent of the monarch; sought through the office of the governor general.

A two-dimensional representation of St. Edward's Crown has been used in a variety of designs since the 1950s; as directed by Queen Elizabeth II when she acceded to the throne. Before the adoption of St. Edward's Crown, a two-dimensional representation of the Tudor Crown was used throughout several designs to represent royal authority. The physical St Edward's Crown remains the property of the King in Right of the United Kingdom; although its two-dimensional representation has been adopted for use to represent royal authority in various Commonwealth realms, including Canada.

=== Canadian Royal Crown ===
The Canadian Royal Crown

The Canadian Royal Crown was unveiled in May 2023 to mark the Coronation of Charles III. It was designed by Cathy Bursey-Sabourin, Fraser Herald and Principal Artist of the Canadian Heraldic Authority. The design is based on the Tudor Crown but replaces the crosses, fleur-de-lis and jewels with Canadian and geographic symbols. It consists of a gold rim and two intersecting arches set with pearls, at the bases of which are maple leaves and within which is a red cap lined with ermine fur. At the apex of the arches is a stylized snowflake resembling the insignia of the Order of Canada, of which the monarch is the Sovereign. On the band is a blue, wavy line symbolizing the country's waterways and ocean borders, emphasizing the importance of the environment to Canadians, as well as Indigenous teachings that water is the lifeblood of the land, and, on the ring's upper edge, are triangular peaks and dips recalling Canada's rugged landscape.

The heraldic crown is selected by the reigning monarch as a royal prerogative. Charles III selected a Tudor Crown design on his accession in 2022, and Canada initially followed suit. However, the government instructed the Canadian Heraldic Authority to prepare a uniquely Canadian design and advised the king to approve it, which he did in April 2023. This was controversial because the monarch is obliged to accept the advice of their government and because the design removed all Christian symbolism, leading some critics to allege that the symbol of the crown had been politicized and to term it the 'Trudeau Crown' after the Liberal prime minister, Justin Trudeau.

Royal Cypher of King Charles III in Canada

The crown is a "restricted emblem", the use of which requires the permission of the King. It is a "paper crown", meaning it has no physical form and is intended to be used as a symbol only, on the Royal Coat of Arms of Canada, the coats of arms of provinces, the royal cypher, badges and rank insignia of the Canadian Armed Forces and law enforcement agencies, as well as by private organizations significantly associated with the monarchy and on plaques, stamps, stained glass windows, and other commemorations.

=== Snowflake Diadem ===
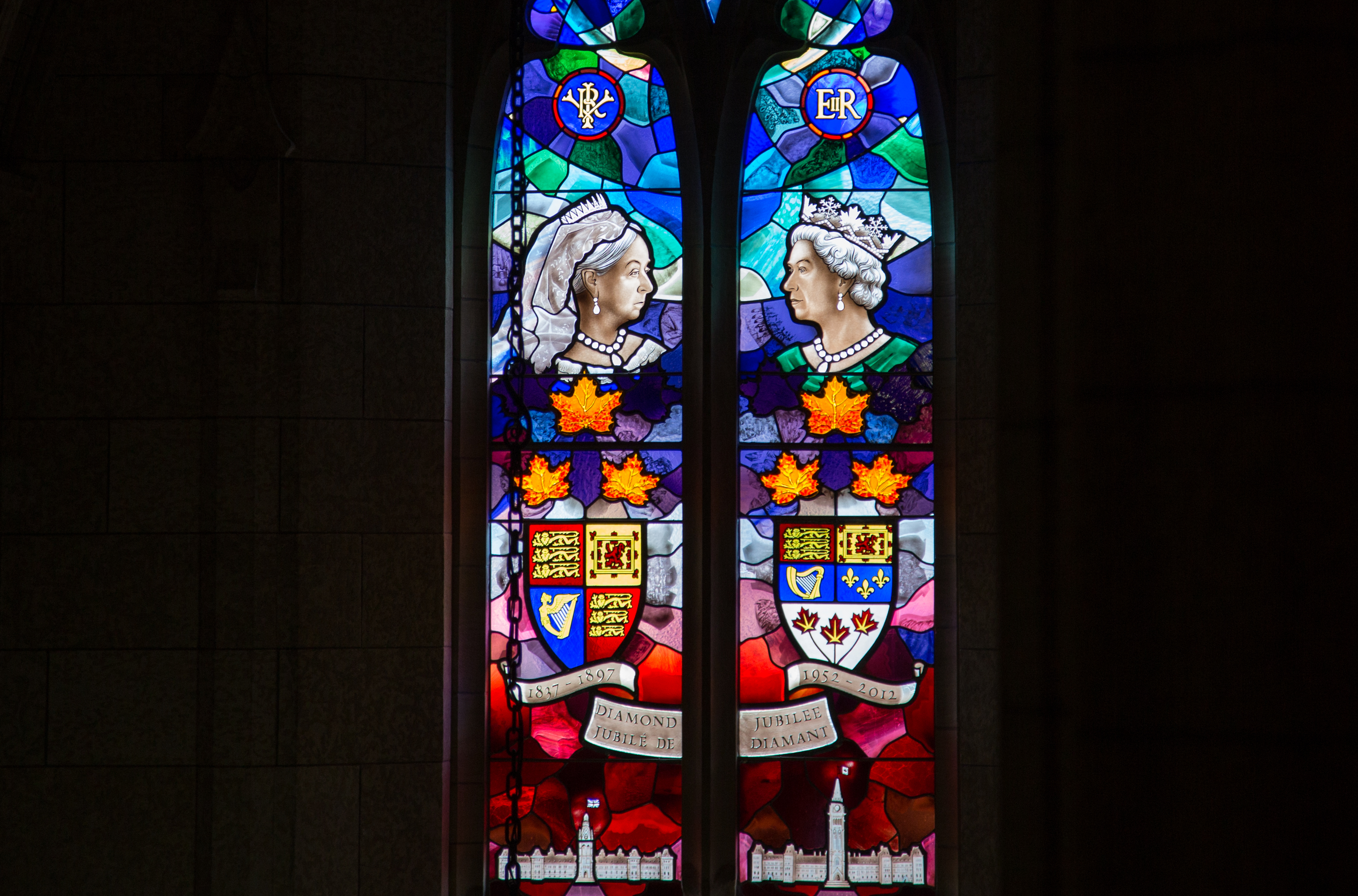
A depiction of Elizabeth II wearing the "Snowflake Diadem", on the Centre Block's Diamond Jubilee Window

In the 21st century, several Canadian decorations and medals were introduced that depict Queen Elizabeth II wearing a diadem known as the Snowflake Diadem. Designed in 2008 and approved by the Queen the same year, the diadem is made up of alternating snowflakes and maple leaves. However, the diadem does not physically exist; it is considered to be a "heraldic invention" for the purposes of "nationalizing the sovereign," and to symbolize her status as the Queen of Canada.

Decorations and medals that have used the Snowflake Diadem on effigies include the Operational Service Medal, Polar Medal, Sacrifice Medal, and Sovereign's Medal for Volunteers. The diadem is also depicted in the Diamond Jubilee Window in the Canadian Senate foyer.

A variation of the Snowflake Diadem, composed of only snowflakes instead of alternating snowflakes and maple leaves, is also used as a heraldic crown for the coat of arms of institutions like the Tax Court of Canada. As with the original Snowflake Diadem design, the snowflake-only design serves as a reference to Canada being a northern realm.

=== Coronets ===
A United Empire Loyalist's military coronet (left) and civil coronet (right)

Similar to, but older than, the Snowflake Diadem, the United Empire Loyalist coronets are heraldic devices available to Canadian descendants of the Loyalists—refugees to Canada of European, African, and Indigenous heritage who were loyal to the Crown and, as such, during and after the American Revolutionary War, forced to leave their homes in what became the United States. The Canadian Heraldic Authority can grant these coronets—either a military or civil version—in an individual's coats of arms, according to the regulations of the United Empire Loyalists' Association, regardless of race, gender, or religion. These consist of gold maple leaves above a gold band, with either oak leaves (civil) or swords (military) in between each leaf. Individuals of French Canadian ancestry may be granted a coronet consisting of gold fleur-de-lis and maple leaves above a gold band.

== Mace ==
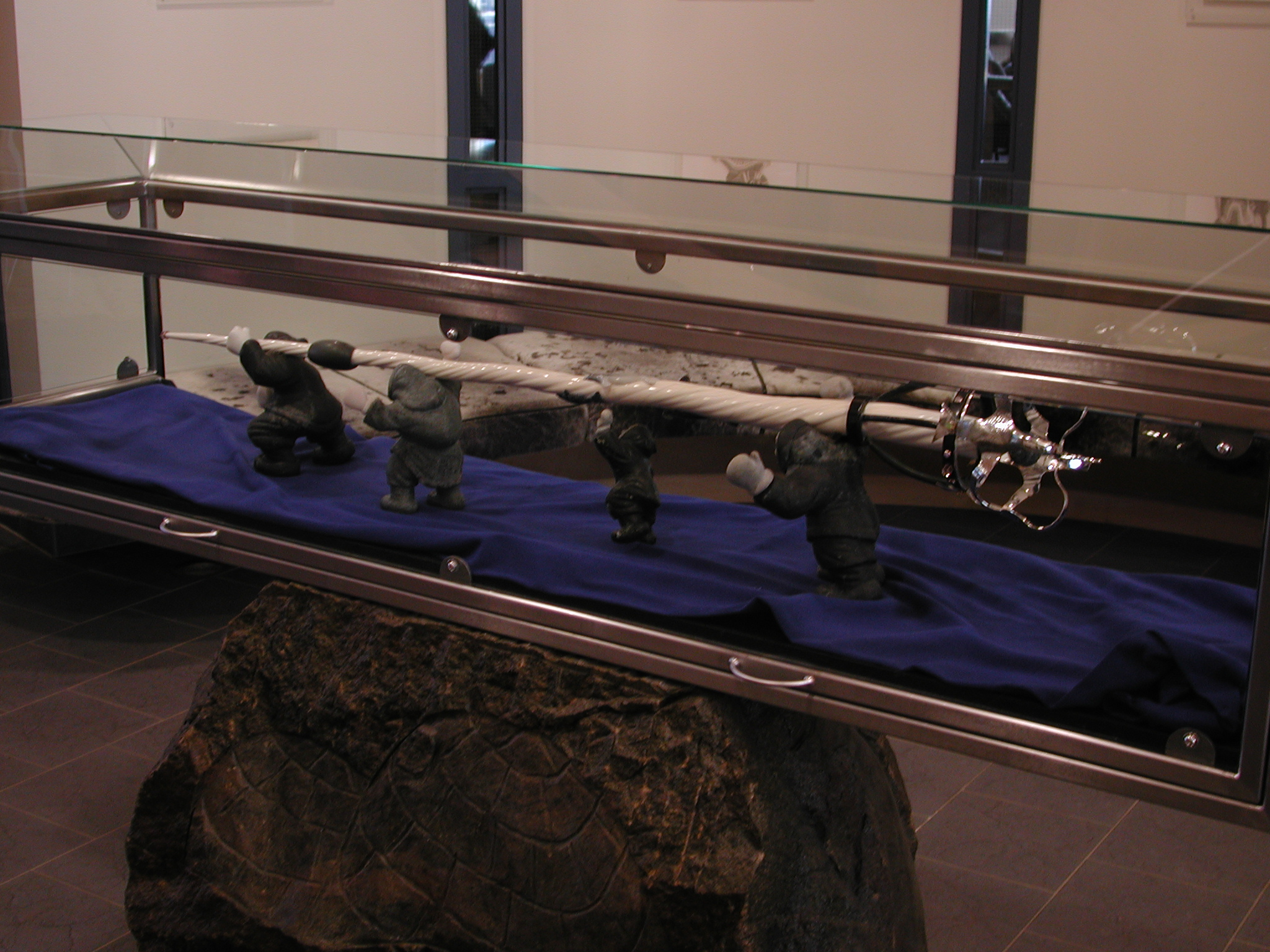
The Mace of the Legislative Assembly of Nunavut, a symbol of the authority the legislature derives from the monarch

In the federal, provincial, and territorial parliaments, maces represent the authority of the monarch in the legislature. At the apex of each mace is a crown, substituting for the deadly bulge of the prehistoric club and the spiked ball of the medieval battle mace. Members of parliament, the legislative assembly, or national assembly cannot pass bills until the relevant mace has been placed before the speaker of the chamber. This acknowledges that parliament's power to legislate stems from the Crown.

== Flags ==
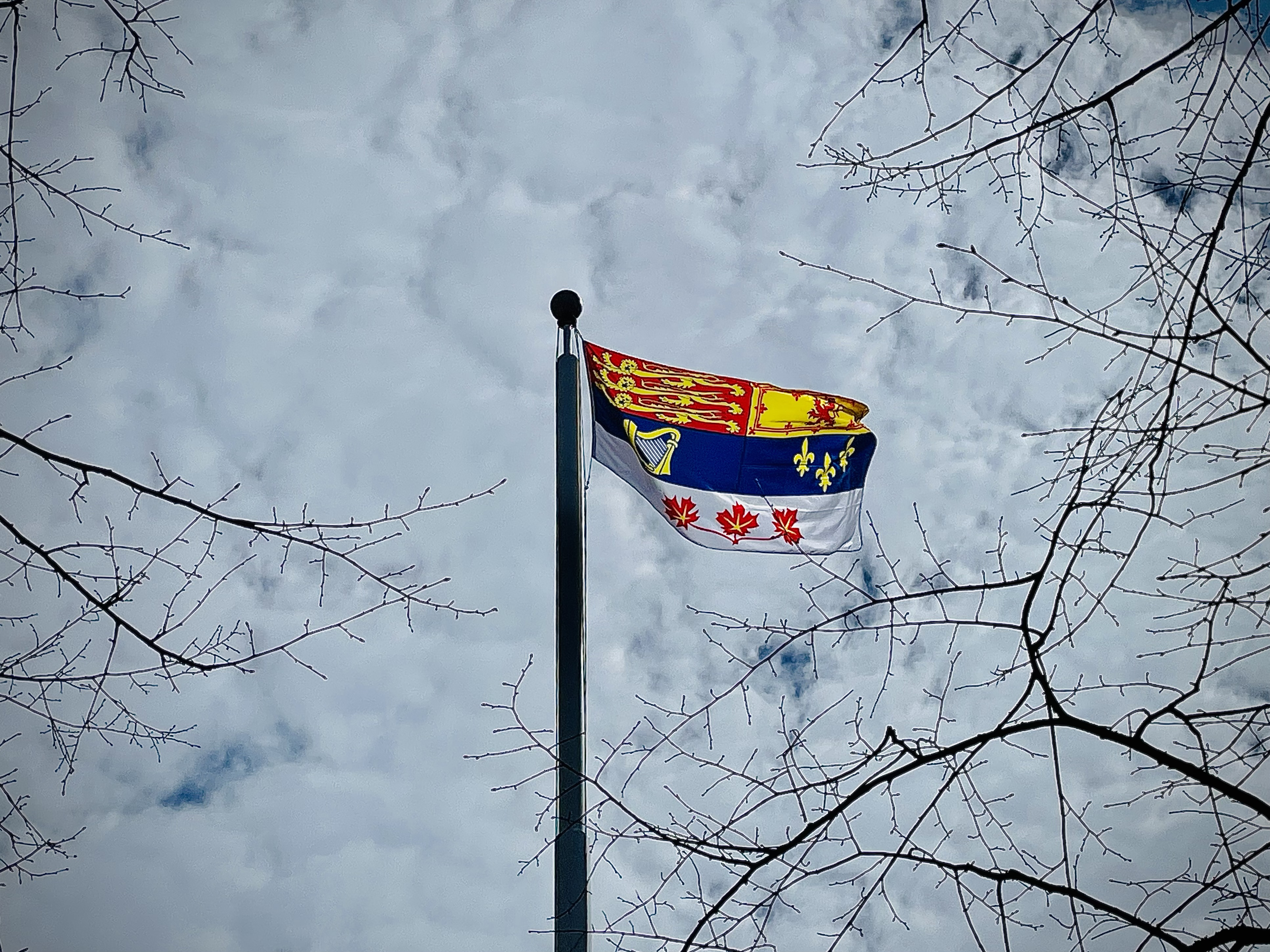
The Sovereign's Flag for Canada flying at Government House in Halifax, Nova Scotia, following King Charles III's coronation.

Similar to coats of arms, flags are utilized to represent royal authority and specific royal and viceroyal offices. The standards of the kings of France were the first royal flags to be used in what is now Canada, a flag bearing the arms of King Louis XIV being used as the symbol of New France after the colony was in 1663 reformed as a royal province of France. The current sovereign's royal standard is the shield of the monarch's Canadian arms in banner form undifferentiated. It was created by the Canadian Heraldic Authority in 2023 for the sovereign's use in Canada or when acting on behalf of the country abroad, the flag being flown from any building or vehicle occupied by the monarch. There are six additional royal standards for other members of the royal family devised by the CHA between 2011 and 2015 and follow in precedence that of the viceroy of the relevant jurisdiction.

The flag of the governor general displays the crest of the Canadian royal arms—a crowned lion holding a maple leaf—and is used in a fashion akin to the sovereign's flag. Each of the provincial viceroys also has a representative flag, most being a blue field on which is displayed the shield of the province's arms surmounted by a crown.

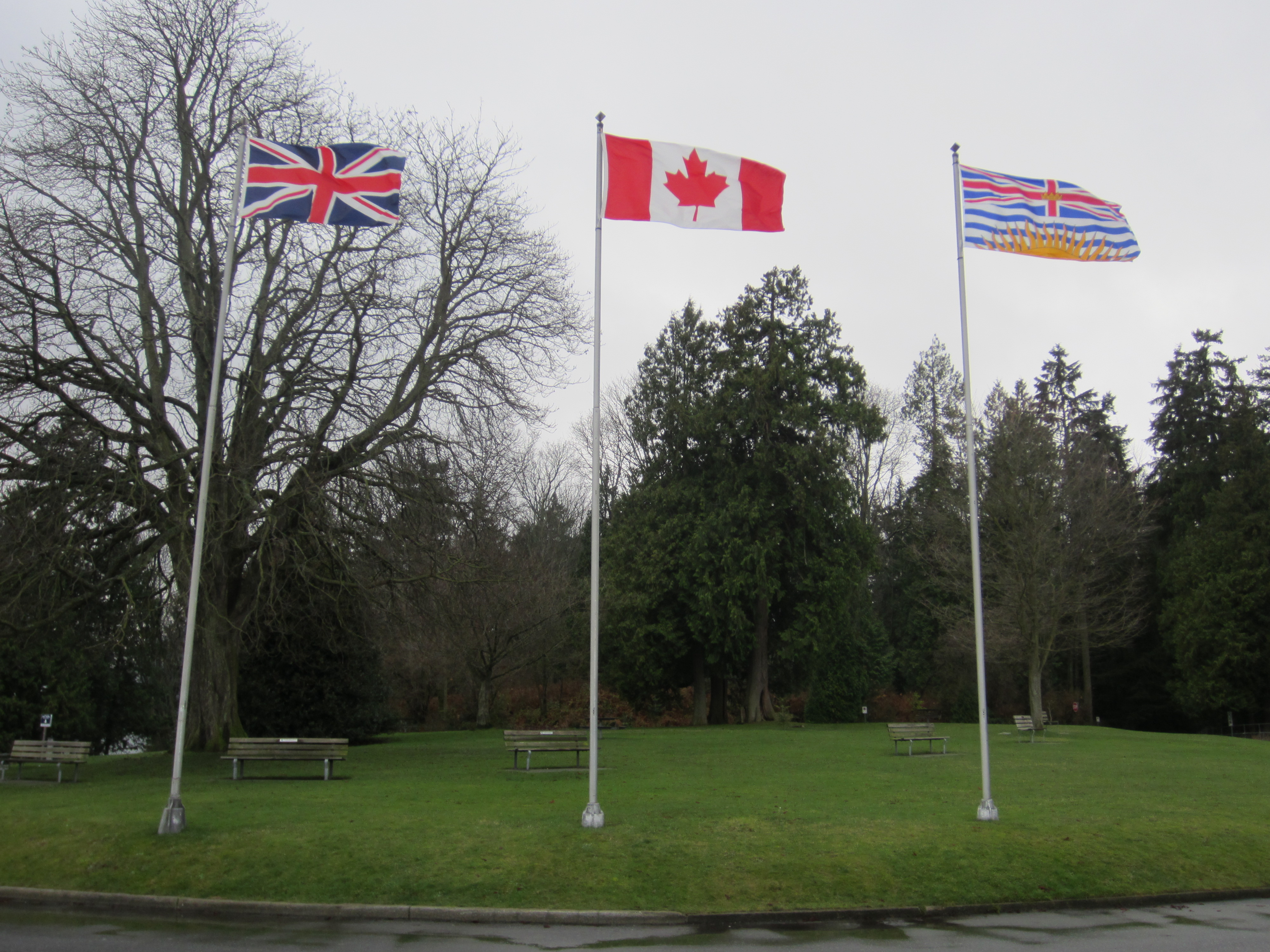
The Royal Union Flag (left) at Stanley Park in Vancouver

The Union Flag was formerly used as a national flag of Canada, prior to the adoption of the National Flag of Canada (the "maple leaf flag") in 1965. It was thereafter retained as an official flag of Canada and renamed the Royal Union Flag by parliamentary resolution, intended as a marker of Canada's loyalty to the Crown and membership in the Commonwealth of Nations. This flag continued to be used by the Canadian military as a personal flag of the sovereign until the Minister of National Defence in 1965, Paul Hellyer, ordered that the new National Flag would be the flag of the then-still-to-be-unified Canadian Armed Forces, leading to the replacement of the Naval Ensign and Royal Canadian Air Force Ensign. Both the Royal Union Flag and the standard of royal France have a prominent place in the Royal Arms of Canada. The former sits in the canton of the flags of Ontario and Manitoba, in the chief of the flag of British Columbia, and, as an abstraction, is the basis of the flag of Newfoundland and Labrador.

== Verbal and musical symbols ==
Music and song are used in various ways as reminders and identifiers of the sovereign or viceroys. By tradition, the tune "God Save the King" (or "God Save the Queen" in the reign of a female monarch) was heard in the Canadian colonies since the late 18th century and continued to be played after Confederation in 1867. In 1980, "O Canada" was adopted as the national anthem and "God Save the Queen" became, by convention, the Royal Anthem, for use as a musical salute to the sovereign in person or as a display of loyalty in any circumstance. It was also incorporated into the Canadian Royal Salute, which is used upon the arrival of the governor general or a lieutenant governor and consists of the first six bars of the Royal Anthem followed by the first and last four bars of "O Canada".

At official functions, regardless of whether or not the monarch is personally present, the Loyal Toast may be recited; it consists of a toast to the health of the sovereign and is generally led by the host of or guest of honour at a ceremony, aside from the monarch him or herself. In English, the toast is: "Ladies and Gentlemen, the King of Canada," and in French: "Mesdames et Messieurs, au Roi du Canada." In the mess of regiments in which the monarch holds an honorary appointment, the toast is modified slightly to be read as: "Ladies and Gentlemen, the King of Canada, our Colonel-in-Chief," and in French: "Mesdames et Messieurs, au Roi du Canada, notre colonel en chef." Where a band is present, the Royal Anthem is played following the recital of the Loyal Toast.

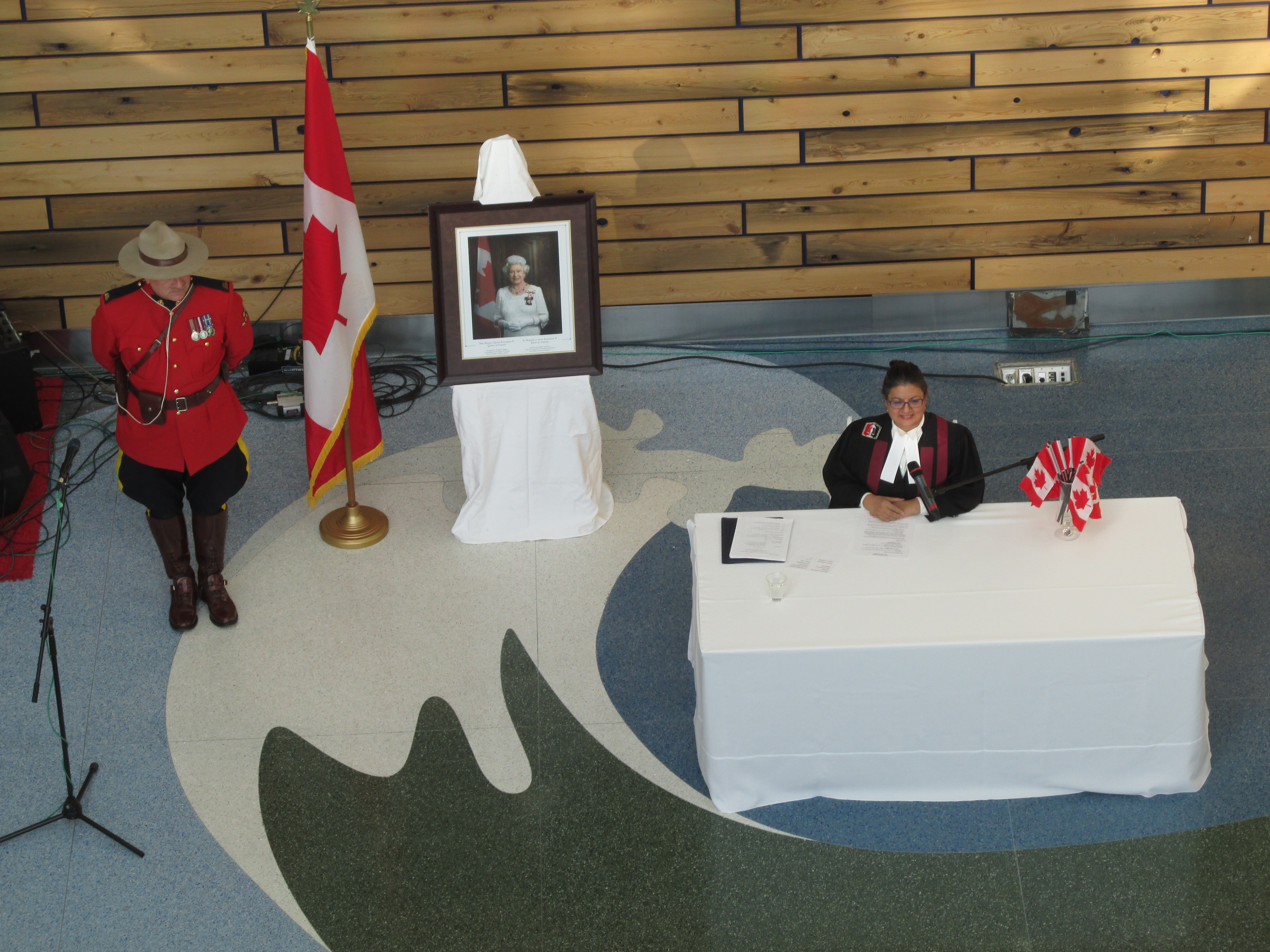
Photo portrait of Queen Elizabeth II at the front of a citizenship ceremony

The monarch also acts as the locus of fealty in the Oath of Allegiance, which also forms a part of the Oath of Citizenship. This giving of allegiance to the sovereign has been described as the expression of "a solemn intention to adhere to the symbolic keystone of the Canadian Constitution as it has been and is, thus pledging an acceptance of the whole of our constitution and national life."

The word royal itself is frequently used as a prefix to the name of an organization that has gained the monarch's favour or patronage. The granting of this distinction falls within the royal prerogative and thus is conferred by the monarch through the office of his or her viceroy, with input from the Ceremonial and Canadian Symbols Promotion Programme within the Department of Canadian Heritage on whether or not the institution meets the designated criteria: The organization must have been in existence for at least 25 years, be financially secure, and be non-profit, amongst others. Any organization that has been so honoured may receive appropriate royal insignia when petitioning the Canadian Heraldic Authority for a grant of armorial bearings or other emblem.

Similarly, crown is commonly used in language related to governance or law enforcement. Terms include Crown ward, Crown land, Crown-held property, Crown corporations, Crown copyright, and the Crown can refer to the government's lawyers in courts of law. Crown is used as the general term expressing the legal personality of the executive of government.

== Calendar dates ==
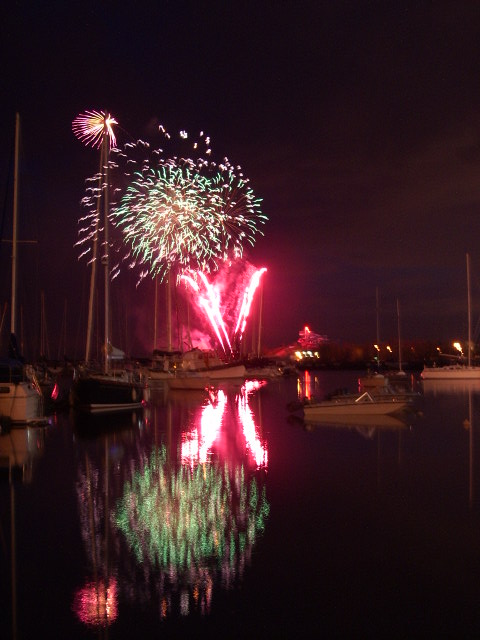
A Victoria Day fireworks display from Ontario Place

Certain dates are of royal significance in Canada. Victoria Day has been since 1834 a holiday to mark the birthday of Queen Victoria. After 1957, the same date was designated as the reigning monarch's official birthday. At military sites, on navy vessels, and on government property, flags will also be flown to mark specific royal occasions, including Accession Day (8 September), the actual birthday of the monarch (14 November), the official birthday of the monarch (Monday before 25 May), and the birthday of the royal consort (17 July).

Each year since 1932, the monarch has delivered the Royal Christmas Message to the British Commonwealth (later the Commonwealth of Nations); originally broadcast on the British Broadcasting Corporation Empire Service, it is today shown in Canada on the Canadian Broadcasting Corporation television and radio. The monarch's Commonwealth Day (second Monday in March) message is not as widely broadcast by the media in Canada.

== Geographic names ==
There are hundreds of places named for Canadian monarchs and members of the Royal Family all across Canada. No individual has been more honoured than Queen Victoria in the names of Canada's public buildings, streets, populated places, and physical features. The trend for naming places after the sovereign began after the Queen granted John Ross permission to name a small bay in the Northwest Passage after her. Following this, explorers and mapmakers gave the name Victoria to a multitude of geographical features all over the Canadian map; her name appears more than 300 times. Also, amongst the 280 postal divisions in Canada, more than half have at least one thoroughfare identified by the name Victoria.

== See also ==
- National symbols of Canada
- Canadian Red Ensign
- Regional tartans of Canada
- Royal Swans
- The Queen's Beasts

== Further information ==
- Pike, Corinna A.W.; McCreery, Christopher (2011), Canadian Symbols of Authority, Toronto: Dundurn, ISBN 978-1-55488-902-0
