= Canadian Silver Maple Leaf =

Silver bullion coin issued by the Canadian Government

Silver Maple Leaf
- Canada
- Value: 5.00 CAD (main series) (Note: The face value for coins in sets varies by their weight.)
- Mass: 31.11 g (1.00 troy oz)
- Diameter: 37.97 mm (1.4948 in)
- Thickness: 3.29 mm (0.1295 in)
- Edge: Serrated (Reeded edge)
- Composition: 99.99% Ag
- Years of minting: 1988–present

Obverse
- Design: Charles III
- Designer: Steven Rosati
- Design date: 2024

Reverse
- Design: Maple Leaf
- Designer: Royal Canadian Mint
- Design date: 1988 (Note: New security features were introduced in 2014)

The Canadian Silver Maple Leaf (French: Feuille d'érable en argent canadienne) is a silver bullion coin that is issued annually by the Government of Canada since 1988. It is produced by the Royal Canadian Mint.

The Silver Maple Leaf is legal tender. The face value is 5 Canadian dollars. The market value of the metal varies, depending on the spot price of silver. The standard version has a weight of 1 troy ounce (31.1 grams).

The Silver Maple Leaf's obverse and reverse display, respectively, the profile of Charles III and the Canadian Maple Leaf. In 2014, new security features were introduced: radial lines and a micro-engraved laser mark.

== History ==
The Silver Maple Leaf is issued annually by the Government of Canada. Introduced in 1988 by the Royal Canadian Mint, there have been four subsequent standard editions and several special editions.

The Silver Maple Leaf's obverse displayed the profile of Elizabeth II up until 2023. There have been three subsequent versions of the Queen's profile:

- 1988–1989: Portrait by Arnold Machin.
- 1990–2003: Portrait by Dora de Pédery-Hunt.
- 2004–2023: Portrait by Susanna Blunt.

Canadian coins released to the public starting in 2024 now bear a new obverse of her successor King Charles III.

- 2024–Present: Portrait by Steven Rosati.

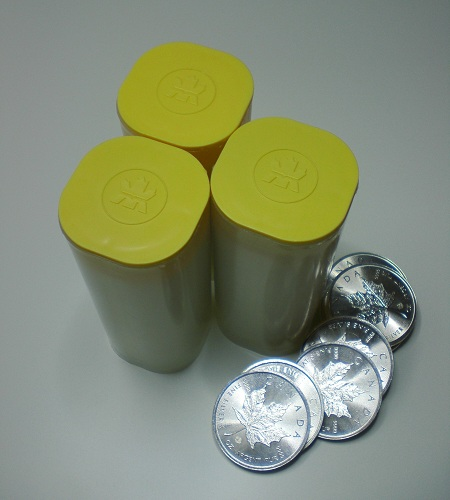
Three 25-coin tubes together with seven coins

The Silver Maple Leaf's reverse displays the Canadian Maple Leaf. This design has remained unchanged since 1988. In 2014, however, new security features were introduced: radial lines and a micro-engraved laser mark. Also the obverse was affected by this.

The phrases CANADA and FINE SILVER 1 OZ ARGENT PUR are universal elements.

Granted a face value of 5 Canadian dollars, the Silver Maple Leaf has status as legal tender. It has also a market value that depends on the spot price of silver and that normally exceeds the nominal face value. With few exceptions and alike similar international bullion coins, the Silver Maple Leaf has a weight of 1 troy ounce (31.1 grams). The 99.99% silver content makes the coin among the finest official bullion coins worldwide.

Samples of the Silver Maple Leaf often carry a blemish that has a milky-white appearance, called a milk spot. This happens when a cleaning detergent is left on the coin when it goes into the annealing furnace. This issue was addressed in 2018 with the RCM introduction of "MINTSHIELD" surface protection technology to prevent milk spots.

The Silver Maple Leaf was originally packaged in boPET. Since 2009, due to increasing demand, it is packaged in semi-transparent tubes with a yellow lid bearing the RCM logo. Some special editions have tubes with an orange, red, blue, dark blue or grey lid. Each tube contains 25 coins. Furthermore, there exist boxes that contain 20 tubes each.

== Specifications ==
Years	Denominations	Purity	Obverse	Reverse
1988-1989	1 oz, ^{1}/_{2} oz, ^{1}/_{4} oz, ^{1}/_{10} oz	.9999	Portrait of Queen Elizabeth II aged 39 facing right	Maple leaf on a flat surface
1990-1992	1 oz, ^{1}/_{2} oz, ^{1}/_{4} oz, ^{1}/_{10} oz	.9999	Portrait of Queen Elizabeth II aged 64 facing right	Maple leaf on a flat surface
1993-2003	1 oz, ^{1}/_{2} oz, ^{1}/_{4} oz, ^{1}/_{10} oz, ^{1}/_{20} oz	.9999	Portrait of Queen Elizabeth II aged 64 facing right	Maple leaf on a flat surface
2004-2013	1 oz, ^{1}/_{2} oz, ^{1}/_{4} oz, ^{1}/_{10} oz, ^{1}/_{20} oz	.9999	Portrait of Queen Elizabeth II aged 79 facing right	Maple leaf on a flat surface
2014-2017	1 oz, ^{1}/_{2} oz, ^{1}/_{4} oz, ^{1}/_{10} oz, ^{1}/_{20} oz	.9999	Portrait of Queen Elizabeth II aged 79 facing right	Maple leaf with radial lines and micro-engraved maple leaf hologram
2018-2023	1 oz, ^{1}/_{2} oz, ^{1}/_{4} oz, ^{1}/_{10} oz, ^{1}/_{20} oz	.9999	Portrait of Queen Elizabeth II aged 79 facing right	Maple leaf with radial lines and micro-engraved maple leaf hologram + Mintshield surface
2023-Present	1 oz, ^{1}/_{2} oz, ^{1}/_{4} oz, ^{1}/_{10} oz, ^{1}/_{20} oz	.9999	Portrait of King Charles III facing left	Maple leaf with radial lines and micro-engraved maple leaf hologram + Mintshield surface

== Mintage (main series) ==
Year	Mintage	Ref.	Year	Mintage	Ref.	Year	Mintage	Ref.
1988	1,155,931		1998	591,359		2008	7,909,161	
1989	3,332,200		1999	1,229,442		2009	9,727,592	
1990	1,708,800		2000	403,652		2010	17,799,992	
1991	644,300		2001	398,563		2011	23,129,966	
1992	343,800		2002	576,196		2012	18,132,297	
1993	1,133,900		2003	684,750		2013	28,222,061	
1994	889,946		2004	680,925		2014	29,245,000	
1995	326,244		2005	955,694		2015	N/A	
1996	250,445		2006	2,464,727		2016	N/A	
1997	100,970		2007	3,526,052		2017	N/A	

The issue from the year 2000 was sold as an uncirculated bulk coin yet bears the Fireworks privy mark on it.

It is re-listed in the special privy mark section below but is still essentially part of the standard bullion series.

== Commemoratives ==
=== Anniversaries ===
Year	Mintage	Artist (reverse)	Artist (obverse)	Description	FV	Set
1998	13,533	RCM engravers	Dora de Pedery-Hunt	10th Anniversary Silver Maple Leaf	$50.00	10-ounce coin in reverse proof, with COA made of sterling silver, in a black leather-box.
2003	28,947	RCM engravers	RCM engravers	15th Anniversary Silver Maple Leaf	$1 - $5	5-coin set: 1, 1/2, 1/4, 1/10, and 1/20 oz. Hologram maple leaf.
2008	10,000	RCM engravers	RCM engravers	20th Anniversary Silver Maple Leaf		Gold-plated maple leaf.
2013	9,999	Arnold Nogy	Susanna Blunt	25th Anniversary Silver Maple Leaf	$1 - $5	5-coin set: 1, 1/2, 1/4, 1/10 and 1/20 oz.
2013	1,000,000	Walter Ott (RCM)	Susanna Blunt	25th Anniversary Canadian Maple Leaf	$5.00	1-ounce coin.
2013	10,000	Jean-Louis Sirois	Susanna Blunt	25th Anniversary Silver Piedfort	$5.00	1-ounce coin.
2013	10,000	Jean-Louis Sirois	Arnold Machin	25th Anniversary Silver Maple Leaf	$5.00	1-ounce matte proof coin with selective gold plating on the reverse
2013	2,000	Jean-Louis Sirois	Arnold Machin	25th Anniversary Silver Maple Leaf	$50.00	5-ounce matte proof coin with selective gold plating on the reverse, in red lacquer-box
2013	2,500	Arnold Nogy	Arnold Machin	25th Anniversary Silver Maple Leaf	$50.00	5-ounce coin reverse proof, in red lacquer-box
2018	5,000	RCM engravers	Susanna Blunt	30th Anniversary Silver Maple Leaf	$5.00	2 x 1-ounce coin, modified reverse proof and modified matte proof (both w. laser-engraved pattern)
2018	6,000	RCM engravers	Susanna Blunt	30th Anniversary Silver Maple Leaf	$10.00	2-ounce coin, modified matte proof (w. laser-engraved pattern), both s. Gold-plated
2018	6,500	Pierre Leduc	Susanna Blunt	30th Anniversary Maple Leaf Quartet	$3.00	4 square coins, reverse proof, both s. rose Gold-plated, all 4 coins together display a big maple leaf
2018		RCM engravers	Susanna Blunt	30th Anniversary Silver Maple Leaf	$5.00	1-ounce coin
2023	3,000	RCM engravers	Susanna Blunt	35th Anniversary Silver Maple Leaf	$1 - $5.00	5-coin set: 1, 1/2, 1/4, 1/10, and 1/20 oz. with rose gold trim, double-dated 1988-2023
2023	2,000	RCM engravers	Susanna Blunt	35th Anniversary Silver Maple Leaf	$50	5-ounce coin with selective gold plating on a modified reverse
2023	150	RCM engravers	Susanna Blunt	35th Anniversary Silver Maple Leaf	$500	5kg coin on a modified reverse

== Editions with special privy marks ==
In 1999, many Silver Maple Leaf coins were issued with a privy mark to commemorate the 20th anniversary of the RCM Maple Leaf Program. In the following year, the coins featured a privy mark with fireworks and the number 2000. Another Silver Maple Leaf version was issued to commemorate the millennium. The coins were double-dated 1999 and 2000.

=== Anniversaries and commemorations ===
Year	Privy mark	Artist	Mintage	Comment
1989	10 year anniv. of GML	RCM engravers, Arnold Machin	30,000	Sold by RCM in a wooden box. Only luster finishing, but no privy mark, matte proof
1998	90th Anniversary Royal Canadian Mint	Walter Ott, RCM engravers	13,025	Sold by RCM.
1998	Royal Canadian Mounted Police	Walter Ott, RCM engravers	25,000	Made for Canada Post.
1998	Titanic	Walter Ott, RCM engravers	26,000	Made for Dillon Gage.
1999–2000	Fireworks	Walter Ott, RCM engravers	298,775	Dual-dated. All maple leafs dated 1999-2000 show fireworks privy with no date inside the oval privy mark.
2000	Fireworks	Walter Ott, RCM engravers	403,652	All maple leafs dated 2000 show fireworks privy with "2000" inside the oval privy mark.
2000	Expo Hanover	Walter Ott, RCM engravers	25,000	Included a certificate of authenticity. Released in Europe only.
2004	Alphonse Desjardins	Walter Ott, RCM engravers	15,000	Sold by La Caisse Populaire Desjardins
2004	D-Day	Walter Ott, RCM engravers	11,698	Included a certificate of authenticity.
2005	Dutch Tulip Liberation of the Netherlands 60th anniversary	Walter Ott, RCM engravers	3,500	Made for Royal Dutch Mint.
2005	Victory in Europe	Walter Ott, RCM engravers	7,000	Sold in US by Jerry Morgan.
2005	Victory in Japan	Walter Ott, RCM engravers	7,000	Sold in US by Jerry Morgan.
2009	London's Tower Bridge	RCM engravers	75,000	Released by 'CoinInvestDirect.com' in Europe only.
2009	Brandenburg Gate	RCM engravers	50,000	Released by 'CoinInvestDirect.com' in Europe only.
2012	Leaning Tower of Pisa	RCM engravers	50,000	Released by 'CoinInvestDirect.com' in Europe only.
2012	Titanic 100th anniversary	RCM engravers	25,000	Released by 'APMEX.com'; 2012 privy shows smoke billowing from stacks, 1998 Titanic privy shows no smoke.
2014	World Money Fair in Berlin	RCM engravers	7,500	Sold directly from the Royal Canadian Mint.
2014	ANA World's Fair of Money in Chicago	RCM engravers	7,500	Sold directly from the Royal Canadian Mint.
2014	Chinese Lunar Horse Double Privy	RCM engravers	500	Minted for Chinese Government
2015	Heart (Fisher House Foundation)	RCM engravers	25,000	Radial lines security features with maple leaf security privy at lower left of reverse side. Sold by Rosland Capital.
2015	E=mc^{2}(100th Anniv. of Albert Einstein's Theory)	RCM engravers	50,000	Sold by 'BullionExchanges.com'
2015	ANA World's Fair of Money in Chicago	RCM engravers	5,000	Sold by official dealers of RCM
2016	Timber Wolf privy mark (commemorating 2011 Canadian Wildlife series coins)	RCM engravers	50,000	Reverse Proof; sold directly from the Royal Canadian Mint. This is the 1st coin of the 6-coin set
2016	Grizzly Bear privy mark (commemorating 2011 Canadian Wildlife series coins)	RCM engravers	50,000	Reverse Proof; sold directly from the Royal Canadian Mint. This is the 2nd coin of the 6-coin set
2016	Yin and Yang	RCM engravers	50,000	Reverse Proof. Released before Chinese New Year 2016.
2016	Panda privy mark	RCM engravers	50,000	Reverse Proof; privy design based on 1982 Chinese Gold Panda coin. Released by 'APMEX.com'
2016	Mark V Tank (UK) 100 year anniversary	RCM engravers	50,000	Reverse Proof; Released by Provident Metals
2016	Shamrock/Four Leaf Clover	RCM engravers	50,000	Reverse Proof; Released in tribute to Irish Canadians for St. Patrick's Day 2016.
2016	Bigfoot	RCM engravers	50,000	Reverse Proof; Released by Provident Metals and inspired by the Patterson-Gimlin film of Bigfoot
2016	ANA World's Fair of Money in Anaheim, California Poppy	RCM engravers	6,000	Reverse Proof; Released for 2016 ANA Money Fair in Anaheim, California commemorating California's state flower, the Poppy (Eschscholzia californica)
2017	Panda privy mark	RCM engravers	50,000	Reverse Proof; Panda Privy Maple series based on the 1983 Gold Chinese Panda coin. Coin features a Privy of a Panda standing beside its favourite food bamboo. 'APMEX.com' exclusive
2017	150th Anniversary Logo & 1867-2017 Dual Dates	RCM engravers	150,000	Reverse Proof; Sesquicentennial of the Confederation of Canada. Privy mark on left side of leaf stem is the stylized official "Canada 150" anniversary logo; Privy mark on the right side of leaf stem shows dual dates "1867-2017"
2017	Cougar privy mark (commemorating 2011 Canadian Wildlife series coins)	Pierre Leduc (Reverse), RCM engravers (obverse)	50,000	Reverse Proof; Sold directly from the Royal Canadian Mint. This is the 3rd coin of the 6-coin set.
2017	Moose privy mark (commemorating 2011 Canadian Wildlife series coins)	RCM engravers	50,000	Reverse Proof; Sold directly from the Royal Canadian Mint. This is the 4th coin of the 6-coin set.
2018	Pronghorn Antelope Privy (commemorating 2011 Canadian Wildlife series coins)	RCM engravers	50,000	Reverse Proof; Sold directly from the Royal Canadian Mint. This is the 5th coin of the 6-coin set.
2018	Wood Bison Privy (commemorating 2011 Canadian Wildlife series coins)	RCM engravers	50,000	Reverse Proof; Sold directly from the Royal Canadian Mint. This is the 6th coin of the 6-coin set.
2018	ANA Privy Mark: The Pennsylvania Mountain Laurel	RCM engravers	6,000	Reverse Proof; Originally sold in a RCM Black Box with Red Clamshell, includes a CoA.
2018	Light Bulb (Edison Series?)	RCM engravers	50,000	Reverse Proof; Released by Manfra, Tordella and Brookes (MTB)?
2019	Phonograph (Edison Series?)	RCM engravers	50,000	Reverse Proof; Released by Manfra, Tordella and Brookes (MTB)?
2020	"W" mint mark	Walter Ott (reverse); Susanna Blunt (obverse)	10,000	Presented in a RCM branded clamshell with a black beauty box. Features a "W" mint mark and a Burnished finish. Includes a Certificate of Authenticity.
2021	"W" mint mark	Walter Ott (reverse); Susanna Blunt (obverse)	8,000	Presented in a RCM branded clamshell with a black beauty box. Features a "W" mint mark and a Tailored specimen finish. Includes a Certificate of Authenticity.
2024	First Strikes: Polar Bear Privy mark	Walter Ott, RCM engravers (reverse); Steven Rosati (obverse)	25,000	First bullion strikes featuring His Majesty King Charles III, sold directly from the Royal Canadian Mint. Encapsulated in a premium card. A privy mark with a single polar bear can be seen on the coin.
2024	First Strikes: Congratulations Privy mark	Walter Ott, RCM engravers (reverse); Steven Rosati (obverse)	25,000	First bullion strikes featuring His Majesty King Charles III, sold directly from the Royal Canadian Mint. Encapsulated in a premium card. A Privy mark of Fireworks can be seen on the coin.
2024	First Strikes: Year of the Dragon Privy mark	Walter Ott, RCM engravers (reverse); Steven Rosati (obverse)	25,000	First bullion strikes featuring His Majesty King Charles III, sold directly from the Royal Canadian Mint. Encapsulated in a premium card. A privy mark of a dragon can be seen on the coin.
2025	Treasured Silver Maple Leaf: Polar Bears Privy Mark	Walter Ott, RCM engravers (reverse); Steven Rosati (obverse)	25,000	Bullion with radial lines finish. Sold directly from the Royal Canadian Mint. Encapsulated in a premium card. Features a special privy mark featuring two polar bears.
2025	Treasured Silver Maple Leaf: Congratulations! Privy Mark	Walter Ott, RCM engravers (reverse); Steven Rosati (obverse)	25,000	Bullion with radial lines finish. Sold directly from the Royal Canadian Mint. Encapsulated in a premium card. Features a special fireworks privy mark.
2025	Treasured Silver Maple Leaf: Year of the Snake Privy Mark	Walter Ott, RCM engravers (reverse); Steven Rosati (obverse)	25,000	Bullion with radial lines finish. Sold directly from the Royal Canadian Mint. Encapsulated in a premium card. Features a special snake privy.
2026	Treasured Silver Maple Leaf: Wolf Privy Mark	Walter Ott (reverse); Pierre Leduc (privy mark); Steven Rosati (obverse)	25,000	Bullion with radial lines finish. Sold directly from the Royal Canadian Mint. Encapsulated in a premium card. Features a special privy mark featuring a wolf.
2026	Treasured Silver Maple Leaf: Celebration! Privy Mark	Walter Ott/Mint Engravers (reverse); Steven Rosati (obverse)	25,000	Bullion with radial lines finish. Sold directly from the Royal Canadian Mint. Encapsulated in a premium card. Features a special privy mark featuring balloons.
2026	Treasured Silver Maple Leaf: Year of the Horse Privy Mark	Walter Ott (reverse); Jai Paek (privy mark); Steven Rosati (obverse)	25,000	Bullion with radial lines finish. Sold directly from the Royal Canadian Mint. Encapsulated in a premium card. Features a special privy mark featuring a horse.
2027	Treasured Silver Maple Leaf: Four-Leaf Clover Privy Mark	Walter Ott (reverse); Julien Duguay (privy mark), Steven Rosati (obverse)	20,000	Bullion with radial lines finish. Features a four-leaf clover motif that is traditionally associated with good luck and protection. Encapsulated and presented in a custom-designed packaging.
2027	Treasured Silver Maple Leaf: Loon Privy Mark	Walter Ott (reverse) / Steve Hepburn (privy mark), Steven Rosati (obverse)	20,000	Bullion with radial lines finish. Features a loon privy mark that evokes the Canadian wilderness, the beauty of our lakes and the spirit of the land. Encapsulated and presented in a custom-designed packaging.
2027	Treasured Silver Maple Leaf: Year of the Goat Privy Mark	Walter Ott (reverse) / Jai Paek (privy mark), Steven Rosati (obverse)	20,000	Bullion with radial lines finish. Features a special Year of the Goat privy mark representing artistry and refinement. Encapsulated and presented in a custom-designed packaging.

=== Zodiac series (1998–2009) ===
Year	Privy Mark	Artist	Mintage	Special Notes
1998	Year of the Tiger	Walter Ott, RCM Engravers	25,000	1st coin in Chinese zodiac series
1999	Year of the Rabbit	Walter Ott, RCM Engravers	25,000	2nd coin in Chinese zodiac series
2000	Year of the Dragon	Walter Ott, RCM Engravers	25,000	3rd coin in Chinese zodiac series
2001	Year of the Snake	Walter Ott, RCM Engravers	25,000	4th coin in Chinese zodiac series
2002	Year of the Horse	Walter Ott, RCM Engravers	25,000	5th coin in Chinese zodiac series
2003	Year of the Sheep	Walter Ott, RCM Engravers	25,000	6th coin in Chinese zodiac series
2004	Year of the Monkey	Walter Ott, RCM Engravers	25,000	7th coin in Chinese zodiac series
2005	Year of the Rooster	Walter Ott, RCM Engravers	15,000	8th coin in Chinese zodiac series
2006	Year of the Dog	Walter Ott, RCM Engravers	10,000	9th coin in Chinese zodiac series
2007	Year of the Pig	Walter Ott, RCM Engravers	8,000	10th coin in Chinese zodiac series
2008	Year of the Rat	N/A	8,000	11th coin in Chinese zodiac series
2009	Year of the Ox	N/A	8,000	12th coin in Chinese zodiac series

=== Zodiac series (2012–) ===
Year	Privy Mark	Artist	Mintage	Special Notes
2012	Year of the Dragon	N/A	25,000	released by 'APMEX.com'
2013	Year of the Snake	N/A	85,000	made for Dillon Gage.
2014	Year of the Horse	N/A	85,000	Reverse proof. Made for Dillon Gage.
2014	Year of the Horse Chinese Lunar Double Privy	RCM engravers	500	made for The People's Bank of China and China Construction Bank of Shanghai
2015	Year of the Goat	N/A	N/A	Reverse Proof
2016	Year of the Monkey	N/A	N/A	Reverse Proof
2017	Year of the Rooster	Aries Cheung	N/A	Reverse Proof; Distributed by Bullion Exchanges, LLC
2018	Year of the Dog	Aries Cheung	N/A	Reverse Proof; Royal Canadian Mint
2019	Year of the Pig	Aries Cheung	N/A	Reverse Proof; Royal Canadian Mint
2020	Year of the Rat	Aries Cheung	N/A	Reverse Proof; Royal Canadian Mint
2021	Year of the Ox	Aries Cheung	N/A	Reverse Proof; Royal Canadian Mint
2022	Year of the Tiger	Aries Cheung	N/A	Reverse Proof; Royal Canadian Mint
2023	Year of the Rabbit	N/A	N/A	Reverse Proof; Royal Canadian Mint

=== Fabulous series ===
Year	Privy Mark	Artist	Mintage	Special Notes
2006	F12 Silver Maple Leaf	Royal Canadian Mint engravers	N/A	First issue of the Fabulous series began as Fabulous 12 in 2006 - there was no privy mark on the coin
2007	F12 Silver Maple Leaf	Royal Canadian Mint engravers	5,000	First issue of the Fabulous series with privy mark 'f12', specimen finished
2008	F12 Silver Maple Leaf	Royal Canadian Mint engravers	5,000	Fabulous 12
2009	F12 Silver Maple Leaf	Royal Canadian Mint engravers	5,000	Fabulous 12
2010	F15 Silver Maple Leaf	Royal Canadian Mint engravers	5,000	Series switched to Fabulous 15 in 2010, privy mark 'f15'
2011	F15 Silver Maple Leaf	Royal Canadian Mint engravers	5,000	Fabulous 15
2012	F15 Silver Maple Leaf	Royal Canadian Mint engravers	10,000	Fabulous 15
2013	F15 Silver Maple Leaf	Royal Canadian Mint engravers	10,000	Fabulous 15, bullion finished instead of specimen as before
2014	F15 Silver Maple Leaf	Royal Canadian Mint engravers	10,000	Fabulous 15, bullion finished
2015	F15 Silver Maple Leaf	Royal Canadian Mint engravers	10,000	Fabulous 15, obverse and reverse with radial lines like from common coin issued 2014
2016	F15 Silver Maple Leaf	Royal Canadian Mint engravers	N/A	Fabulous 15, obverse and reverse with radial security lines, but still without maple leaf security privy mark

=== Sets ===
Year	Description	Artist	Mintage	Comment
2003	Hologram set	Dora de Pedery-Hunt	30,000	5-Coin Set - 1 oz, 1/2 oz, 1/4 oz, 1/10 oz, 1/20 oz
2004	Privy Mark Set	RCM Staff	25,000	5-Coin Set – 1 oz, 1/2 oz, 1/4 oz, 1/10 oz, 1/20 oz. Each coin is privy marked with the RCM logo
2004	Zodiac Set	RCM Staff	5,000	12-coin set – each coin in the set carries one of the twelve signs of the Zodiac. Commissioned by Universal Coins from Ottawa, Canada
2004-2005	LEGACY of LIBERTY	RCM Staff	4,200	4-coin set – first poppy quarter colorized (2004) with 3 coins of 1 oz silver 9999: VE DAY (2005), VJ DAY (2005) and D-DAY (2004)
2010	Olympic Maple Leaf Set	N/A	4,000	3-Coin Set (2008, 2009, 2010) – 3x 1 oz., comes in the standard wooden box. Every coin partly gold plated on the reverse.
2013	Fine Silver Maple Leaf - 25th Anniversary Fractional Set	Arnold Nogy (reverse), Arnold Machin (obverse)	9,999	5-Coin Set – 1 oz, 1/2 oz, 1/4 oz, 1/10 oz, 1/20 oz. All five coins in this fractional set on the reverse depict two small sugar maple leaves overlapping the bottom lobes of one large sugar maple leaf. The obverse features the commemorative dates ("1988 2013") the word "ELIZABETH II" and the effigy of Her Majesty. Finish: Reverse Proof. Packaged in a maroon Royal Canadian Mint-branded clamshell with a black slip box.
2014	Fine Silver Fractional Set - The Maple Leaf	Arnold Nogy (reverse), Susanna Blunt (obverse)	9,999	5-Coin Set – 1 oz, 1/2 oz, 1/4 oz, 1/10 oz, 1/20 oz. All five coins feature a reverse image showing two overlapping sugar maple leaves on a frosted background with one leaf being selectively gold plated as well as the edge of the coin. Each coin features an embossed face value as well as the word "CANADA" and the year "2014". The obverse features the effigy of Her Majesty Queen Elizabeth II. Finish: Reverse Proof. Packaged in a maroon Royal Canadian Mint-branded clamshell with a black slip box.
2015	Fine Silver Fractional Set: The Maple Leaf (incuse)	Lilyane Coulombe (reverse), Susanna Blunt (obverse)	9,999	5-Coin Set – 1 oz, 1/2 oz, 1/4 oz, 1/10 oz, 1/20 oz. The 1 oz. coin has been accented with a rich, red translucent enamel that features a sugar maple leaf surrounded by a decorative scroll struck incuse into the frosted field, imprinting the texture of the leaf beneath the surface of the fine silver coin - an ingenious technique perfected by the Royal Canadian Mint engravers. Finish: Reverse Proof. Packaged in a Royal Canadian Mint-branded maroon clamshell with a graphic beauty box.
2016	Fine Silver Maple Leaf Fractional Set: Longest Reigning Sovereign	Donna Kriekle (reverse)	7,500	5-Coin Set – 1 oz, 1/2 oz, 1/4 oz, 1/10 oz, 1/20 oz. All five coins feature a reverse which showcases three engraved maple leaves within a rim that surrounds the work "CANADA", the year "2016", the purity and weight. The 1 oz. coin features pink gold plating on the largest leaf, yellow gold plating on the leaf above the smaller silver leaf and the edge lettering that says "LONGEST REIGNING SOVEREIGN / SOUVERAIN AU PLUS LONG RÈGNE". The obverse features gold plating on the 1952 effigy of Her Majesty wearing the Imperial State Crown. The other four coins only feature the pink gold plated maple leaf. Finish: Reverse Proof. Packaged in a Royal Canadian Mint-branded maroon clamshell with a graphic beauty box.
2017	fine silver 4-coin fractional set – maple leaf tribute	Stan Witten senior engraver at RCM (reverse), Susanna Blunt (obeverse)	5,500	4-coin set: 1 oz, 1/2 oz, 1/4 oz, 1/10 oz. This four coin set features leaves from the silver maple (Acer saccharinum), a species native to Canada, and a focal point of Canada's National Flag. The ext layout echoes that of the famous Silver Maple Leaf bullion coins - yet another notable Canadian achievement embodied by the beloved maple leaf! On the reverse, each coin features Canada's most cherished national symbol and a commemorative double-date (1867-2017) to highlight this historic year. Finish: Reverse Proof. Packaged in a Royal Canadian Mint-branded maroon clamshell with black beauty box.
2019	Fine Silver Maple Leaf Fractional Set - Canada A Bicentennial Celebration	Julius Csotonyi (reverse), Leonard Charles Wyon (Queen Victoria) & Susanna Blunt (QE II) (obverse)	6,500	5 coin set - 1 oz, 1/2 oz, 1/4 oz, 1/10 oz, 1/20 oz. 1 oz. coin features selective blue rhodium plating on the reverse featuring maple leaves floating on water with the double dates 1819 - 2019 to commemorate the 200th anniversary of the birth of Queen Victoria. On the obverse the effigies of Queen Victoria and Her Majesty Queen Elizabeth II with each Sovereign's royal cypher.
2020	Fine Silver Maple Leaf Fractional Set: O Canada	Lisa Thomson Khan (reverse), Susanna Blunt (obverse)	3,000	5 coin set - 1 oz, 1/2 oz, 1/4 oz, 1/10 oz, 1/20 oz. This five coin set celebrates O Canada's 40-year milestone. The 1 oz coin features a beautiful red colouring, a Swarovski® element, edge lettering ("01.07.80", the day when O Canada officially became our national anthem); and a mini musical staff with the opening notes of the national song. Finish: Reverse Proof. Packaged in a Black clamshell with black beauty box.
2021	Fine Silver Maple Leaf Fractional Set - Our Arboreal Emblem: The Maple Tree	RCM Engravers (reverse), Susanna Blunt (obverse)	3,000	5 coin set - 1 oz, 1/2 oz, 1/4 oz, 1/10 oz, 1/20 oz. All five coins are double-dated ("1996 2021") in honour of the 25th anniversary of the designation of the maple tree (Acer spp.) as the national arboreal emblem of Canada. The reverse feature the Royal Canadian Mint's Silver Maple Leaf bullion coin design, rendered using technology that gives the impression the leaf is pulsating when the coin is tilted. The coins are all Reverse Proof finish.
2022	Fine Silver Maple Leaf Fractional Set - A Radiant Crown	Nathalie Lagacé (reverse), Susanna Blunt (obverse)	3,000	5 coin set - 1 oz, 1/2 oz, 1/4 oz, 1/10 oz, 1/20 oz. 1 oz coin is selectively enhanced with diamond glitter technology, a nod to the Diamond Diadem worn by Her Majesty, Queen of Canada, on the coin's obverse. All 5 coins share the same engraved maple-themed design. The coins are all Reverse Proof finish.
2023	Fine Silver Fractional Set - 35th Anniversary of the Silver Maple Leaf	Marie Elaine Cusson (reverse), Susanna Blunt (obverse)	3,000	5 coin set - 1 oz, 1/2 oz, 1/4 oz, 1/10 oz, 1/20 oz. 1 oz. coin includes rose gold plating that further emphasizes the raised maple leaf rim as the standout feature. All five coins are double-dated ("1988 2023") which features a classically styled red maple (Acer rubrum) leaf, a dazzling Canadian maple that gets its name from the spring colour of its flowers and leaf buds. That "blush" of colour inspired the application of rose gold plating to the 1oz coin, where the raised rim consists of an engraved pattern of 35 tiny maple leaves that artfully elevates our SML anniversary celebration to new heights.
2024	Fine Silver Fractional Set - Canada's Autumn Beauty	Celia Godkin (reverse), Susanna Blunt (obverse)	3,000	5 coin set - 1 oz, 1/2 oz, 1/4 oz, 1/10 oz, 1/20 oz. All five coins feature on the reverse a classically styled portrait of a red maple (Acer rubrum) twig and leaves. On the 1 oz. coin, selective gold plating adds a luminous touch of fall colour to the leaves and to the rim. Each obverse also bears a special marking that includes four peals symbolizing the four effigies that have graced Canadian coins and the double date of her reign. Finish: Reverse Proof. Packaged in a Black clamshell with black beauty box.
2024	Treasured Maple Leaf: Effigies 3-Coin Set (Premium Bullion)	Walter Ott (reverse), 2022 - Susanna Blunt (obverse), 2023 - Susanna Blunt (obverse), 2024 - Steven Rosati (obverse)	3,000	3-coin set, 1 oz each. This set shows the transition of effigies on their obverses—from the last year of Queen Elizabeth II's reign (2022) to a time of transition (2023), and the introduction of the new effigy of His Majesty King Charles III (2024). Encapsulated in a presentation folder.
2025	99.99% Pure Silver Fractional Set - Celebrate the 60th anniversary of Canada's flag. 5-coin set.	Marie-Élaine Cusson (reverse), Arnold Machin (obverse)	3,500	5 coin set - 1 oz, 1/2 oz, 1/4 oz, 1/10 oz, 1/20 oz. 1 oz. coin is enhanced with enamel-like paint and Micro-text "CANADA" privy mark. Reverse Proof finish. Packaged in a Black clamshell with black beauty box.
2026	Fine Silver Fractional Set - Commemorate the 100th Birthday of Queen Elizabeth II	Celia Godkin (reverse), Steven Rosati (obverse)	3,500	5 coin set - 1 oz, 1/2 oz, 1/4 oz, 1/10 oz, 1/20 oz. The 1 oz. coin is enhanced with a purple crystal that honours the life and legacy of Queen Elizabeth II. Each coin's obverse features two Canadian coin portraits: the fourth effigy of Queen Elizabeth II, and the effigy of His Majesty King Charles III. Finish: Reverse Proof Packaged in a Black clamshell with black beauty box.
2027	Fine Silver Fractional Set – Autumn Leaves	Nathalie Lagacé (reverse), Steven Rosati (obverse)	3,500	5 coin set - 1 oz, 1/2 oz, 1/4 oz, 1/10 oz, 1/20 oz. The 1 oz. coin is enhanced with a Vivid Toning Effect. This is done by light passing through the colour layer, catching the polished relief underneath and reflecting back outward to give each leaf an iridescent, lit-from-within glow. Finish: Reverse Proof. Packaged in a black Royal Canadian Mint-branded clamshell with a black beauty box.

== Editions with nature-related themes ==
=== Fine silver fractional four-coin sets ===
Year	Description	Artist	Mintage	Description
2004	Arctic Fox	Claude D'Angelo	13,694	4 Coin Set – 1 oz, 1/2 oz, 1/4 oz, 1/10 oz - different reverse picture on every coin
2005	Lynx	Michael Dumas	15,000	4 Coin Set – 1 oz, 1/2 oz, 1/4 oz, 1/10 oz - different reverse picture on every coin
2015	Bald Eagle	Derek C.Wicks	7,500	4 Coin Set—1 oz, 1/2 oz, 1/4 oz, 1/10 oz - the same reverse picture on every coin
2016	The Wolf	Pierre Leduc	7,500	4 Coin Set—1 oz, 1/2 oz, 1/4 oz, 1/10 oz - the same reverse picture on every coin

=== Canadian Wildlife Series ===
Year	Description	Artist	Mintage	Description
2011	Silver Timber Wolf	William Woodruff	1,000,000	1 oz coin. The RCM did not issue any proof versions for this series
2011	Silver Grizzly	William Woodruff	1,000,000	1 oz coin
2012	Silver Cougar	William Woodruff	1,000,000	1 oz coin
2012	Silver Moose	William Woodruff	1,000,000	1 oz coin
2013	Silver Pronghorn Antelope	Emily S. Damstra	1,000,000	1 oz coin
2013	Silver Wood Bison	Emily S. Damstra	1,000,000	1 oz coin

=== Birds of Prey Series ===
Year	Description	Artist	Mintage	Description
2014	Silver Peregrine Falcon (Proof)	Emily S. Damstra	20,000	1 oz coin. Proof frosted version sold directly from the RCM
2014	Silver Peregrine Falcon (bullion)	Emily S. Damstra	1,000,000	1 oz coin. Regular Legal Tender bullion version
2014	Silver Bald Eagle (Proof)	Emily S. Damstra	7,500	1 oz coin. Proof frosted version sold directly from the RCM
2014	Silver Bald Eagle (bullion)	Emily S. Damstra	1,000,000	1 oz coin. Regular Legal Tender bullion version
2015	Silver Red-Tailed Hawk (bullion)	Emily S. Damstra	1,000,000	1 oz coin. Regular Legal Tender bullion version
2015	Silver Great Horned Owl (bullion)	Emily S. Damstra	1,000,000	1 oz coin. Regular Legal Tender bullion version
2016	Silver Peregrine Falcon (Rev Proof)	Emily S. Damstra	100,000	1 oz coin. Reverse Proof version sold directly by RCM
2017	Silver Bald Eagle (Rev Proof)	Emily S. Damstra	100,000	1 oz coin. Reverse Proof version sold directly by RCM

=== Predator Series ===
Year	Description	Artist	Mintage	Description
2016	Silver Cougar	Emily S. Damstra	1,000,000	1 oz coin. Regular Legal Tender bullion version
2017	Silver Lynx	Emily S. Damstra	500,000	1 oz coin. Regular Legal Tender bullion version
2018	Silver Wolf	Emily S. Damstra	300,000	1 oz coin. Regular Legal Tender bullion version
2019	Silver Grizzly	Emily S. Damstra	500,000	1 oz coin. Regular Legal Tender bullion version

=== Coloured Silver Maple Leaf Series (Seasonal / Botanical sub-series) ===
Year	Description	Artist	Mintage	Description
2001	Autumn Maple Leaf	William Woodruff (Reverse)	49,709	1 oz Coin, Proof Finish, $5 face value, encapsulated and sold in RCM clamshell case and outer sleeve and insert.
2002	Spring Maple Leaf	William Woodruff (Reverse)	30,000	1 oz Coin, Proof Finish, $5 face value, encapsulated and sold in RCM clamshell case and outer sleeve and insert.
2003	Summer Maple Leaf	Stan Witten (Reverse)	27,707	1 oz Coin, Proof Finish, $5 face value, encapsulated and sold in RCM clamshell case and outer sleeve and insert.
2004	Winter Maple Leaf	Stan Witten (Reverse)	27,000	1 oz Coin, Proof Finish, $5 face value, encapsulated and sold in RCM clamshell case and outer sleeve and insert.
2005	Big Leaf / Broadleaf Maple Leaf	Stan Witten (Reverse)	27,000	1 oz Coin, Proof Finish, $5 face value, encapsulated and sold in RCM maroon presentation case with black beauty box and CoA.
2006	Silver Maple Leaf	Stan Witten (Reverse)	20,000	1 oz Coin, Proof Finish, $5 face value, encapsulated and sold in RCM maroon presentation case with black beauty box and CoA.
2007	Sugar Maple Leaf in Orange	Stan Witten (Reverse)	20,000	1 oz Coin, Proof Finish, $5 face value, encapsulated and sold in RCM clamshell case, outer graphic sleeve and CoA.

=== Canadian Arctic Series 1.5 oz ===
Year	Description	Artist	Mintage	Description
2013	Silver Polar Bear (proof)	Germaine Arnaktauyok	17,500	Proof version sold directly from the RCM. 1.5 oz coin
2013	Silver Polar Bear (bullion)	Germaine Arnaktauyok	500,000	1.5 oz coin. Regular bullion version
2014	Silver Arctic Fox (proof)	Maurice Gervais	7,500	The proof version of this coin is 1 oz and not 1.5 oz
2014	Silver Arctic Fox (bullion)	Maurice Gervais	500,000	1.5 oz coin. Regular bullion version
2015	Silver Polar Bear and Cub (proof)	Susanna Blunt	7,500	The proof version of this coin is 1 oz and not 1.5 oz
2015	Silver Polar Bear and Cub (bullion)	Susanna Blunt	500,000	1.5 oz coin. Regular bullion version

=== Other Silver Maple Leaf coins ===
Year	Description	Artist (reverse, obverse)	Mintage	Description
2004	Sambro Island Lighthouse	Hedly Doty and William Woodruff	18,476	1 oz coin in box, face value $20
2005	Toronto Island Lighthouse	Brian Hughes and William Woodruff	13,812	1 oz coin in box, face value $20
2006	Silver Timber Wolf	William Woodruff	106,800	1/2 oz coin
2010	Silver Piedfort	Royal Canadian Mint Engravers, Susanna Blunt	9,000	1 oz coin in box - first ever pure silver piedfort coin featuring Maple Leaf design
2011	Maple Leaf Forever	Debbie Adams, Susanna Blunt	999	1-kilogram coin, $250, proof, in a maple wooden box
2014	Bullion Replica	RCM engravers, Susanna Blunt	20,000	Premium version of the popular Silver Maple Leaf bullion design, no privy mark, 1 oz coin in box
2014	High Relief Maple Leaves	Luc Normandin, Susanna Blunt	2,500	5-ounce coin, $50, matte proof, in red lacquer-box
2015	Lustrous Maple Leaves	Michelle Grant, Susanna Blunt	1,500	5-ounce coin, $50, proof, first-ever 5 oz. silver coin to feature a hologram, in red lacquer-box
2016	Superman Silver Bullion Coin	N/A	1,000,000	Version of the popular Silver Maple Leaf bullion design, with security privy mark - tiny maple leaf with 16 in the centre. 1 oz legal tender coin with radial lines on both sides. Instead of Maple Leaf on the reverse there's Superman's signature - "S-Shield".
2017	Canada 150 - Canadian Icons	Tami Mayrand, Susanna Blunt	1,500	5-ounce coin, $50, proof, a collage of red-coloured icons form a maple leaf (with official Canada 150 privy mark)
2017	Magnificent Maple Leaves	Celia Godkin, Susanna Blunt	N/A	10-ounce coin, $50, encapsulated bullion coin
2017	Maple Leaf Quartet	Celia Godkin, Susanna Blunt	7,500	4 square coins, 4 x $3, reverse proof, all 4 coins together display a big maple leaf
2017	Canada 150 - Iconic Maple Leaf	RCM engravers, Susanna Blunt	6,000	2-ounce coin, $10, modified matte proof (w. laser-engraved pattern)
2018	Incuse Maple Leaf	RCM engravers, Susanna Blunt	250,000 (?)	1-ounce coin, $5
2020	Kraken	RCM engravers, Susanna Blunt	Unlimited, unknown at this time	Creatures of the North

=== Hologram Silver Maple Leaf ===
Year	Theme	Artist	Mintage	Special Notes
2001	Maple of Good Fortune	N/A	29,817	First coin in Chinese hologram series
2002	15th Anniversary of the One Dollar Loon	Royal Canadian Mint Staff	29,970	$5 Loon
2003	15th Anniversary of the Silver Maple Leaf	RCM Staff	28,947	5 Coin Set – 1 oz, 1/2 oz, 1/4 oz, 1/10 oz, 1/20 oz
2003	Maple of Good Fortune	N/A	29,731	Second coin in Chinese hologram series
2005	Maple of Hope	Toan Nguyen	19,888	Third coin in Chinese hologram series
2007	Blessings of Long Life	Jianping Yuan	15,000	Not 1 oz, but is still pure silver
2009	Maple of Wisdom	Simon example	14,888	Sterling silver; the coin is not a true Silver Maple Leaf
2010	Maple of Strength	Simon example	8,888	Sterling silver; the coin is not a true Silver Maple Leaf
2011	Maple of Happiness	Simon example	8,888	Return to 1 oz pure silver; it is a true Silver Maple Leaf
2012	Maple of Good Fortune	Three Degrees Creative Group	8,888	1 oz pure silver. A true Silver Maple Leaf
2013	Maple of Peace	Simon example	8,888	1 oz pure silver. A true Silver Maple Leaf
2014	Maple of Longevity	Simon example	8,888	1 oz pure silver. Sixth coin in the renowned series. Face value: $15.
2015	Maple of Prosperity	Albert Ng	8,888	1 oz pure silver. Seventh coin in the renowned series. Face value: $15.

=== Olympic Maple Leaf ===
Year	Theme	Mintage
2008	Inukshuk	937,839
2009	Thunderbird	569,048
2010	Ice Hockey	79,278
2010	Ice Hockey, gold plated in box	10,000
2010	Set of 3 coins, partly gold plated in box	4,000

== See also ==
- American Silver Eagle
- Australian Silver Kangaroo
- Silver Britannia
- Canadian Gold Maple Leaf
  - Big Maple Leaf
- Canadian Platinum Maple Leaf
- Silver as an investment
