= David Hannan =

David Hannan may refer to:

- David Hannan (cinematographer), Australian cinematographer
- David Hannan (artist) (born 1971), Métis Canadian artist
- Dave Hannan (born 1961), Canadian ice hockey left winger
