= David Hannan (artist) =

Métis Canadian artist

- Born: 1971 (age 54–55); Ottawa, Ontario, Canada
- Education: Ontario College of Art
- Known for: Painter, sculptor, mixed media artist, installation artist

David Hannan (born 1971) is a Métis Canadian who is a painter, sculptor, filmmaker, and a mixed media artist and currently lives in Toronto, Ontario. He graduated from the Ontario College of Art with a diploma in 1995. Most of Hannan's work have been based around his cultural heritage, the history and events of indigenous rights, and the ideas change and metamorphosis.

== Early life and education ==
Hannan was born in 1971 in Ottawa, Ontario, to a mother with Miꞌkmaq and Algonquin ancestry from and to a non-native father. His maternal grandmother was of family was of mixed Mik'maq ancestry from Richibucto, New Brunswick, while his maternal grandfather family was of mixed Algonquin ancestry from northeastern Ontario. /> Due to his father's work at a survey company, he often stayed with his maternal grandmother for months intermittently who encouraged his interest in art and provided him the supplies and drawing materials. Hannan has a brother who works in the computer field but was a former photographer.

=== Education ===
When Hannan was in elementary school, he was put into a special education class until eighth grade when his family moved to Thailand for his father's work for three years where he learned how to speak Thai in the first six months. Hannan stayed in Bangkok and attended an international school there where he met and befriended Robert Gutowski, an art teacher at his school. In 1988 Hannan then returned to Ottawa and went to high school there at the Canterbury High School for the Arts and graduated in 1991 he then later moved to Toronto to attend the Ontario College of Art where he received numerous awards, scholarships, and his diploma in 1995. Hannan's parents had supported him in his pursuit in becoming an artist.

== Career ==
=== Early paintings ===
Shortly after receiving his degree, Hannan became a painter and created images with the style of a collage making use of family photos in his work. His early work in this style suggested one of two themes, two of his works, Camping Stories and At the Cottage, suggest a more happy and relaxing time, two other images on the other hand, Broken Man and Untitled (Crossfire), represent times of hardship. Most of Hannan's paintings are multi-media works incorporate his Métis background by containing pieces of Melton cloth, a material with significant ties to the first contact between Europeans and First Nations peoples. In 2000 Hannan created works based on Louis Riel, a controversial historical figure in Canada due to his actions during the Red River Rebellion and North-West Rebellion.

=== Sculpting ===
In 2001, Hannan had extended his skills into sculpting and installation art. His works at the time such as Invaded Wilderness and Copper Land both featured the usage of copper in both works encroaching on the environment as a reference to Canada being the 5th largest producer of copper at the time. Hannan had reached a point where commissions mainly came to him in 2003 however he describes his own life in the art field as tough due to difficulty to pay bills and the talent required to remain in it.

=== Puppeteer ===
Hannan was employed by Waterwood Theater Projects based in Toronto some time in 2003. Hannan and Dan Wood (A long time collaborator with Waterwood Theater Projects) worked together to write, build, rehearsed and performed a puppet show which did not carry any of Hannan's previous themes from his culture. Hannan, during an interview in 2003, believed that he did not need to be pegged down to having to work strictly on Native themes as a Native artist.

== Artworks and exhibitions ==
=== 50 Cents - Return to Batoche ===
In 2003 Hannan had designed a new sterling silver 50-cent coin for Canada and was engraved by Hannan, Dora de Pédery Hunt, and Stan Witten. The coin was revealed in the summer in Batoche of that year to the public and was made to honor the Métis festival which was held in Batoche every year. The obverse side of the coin featured an engraving of Elizabeth II with the word Canada at the top, Elizabeth II at the bottom, and to the side of the engraving of Elizabeth II said 50 cents. The reverse side had the lettering, Saskatchewan 2003 Saskatchewan.

=== ALLcreatures ===
One of Hannan's exhibitions which opened in October 19, 2006, to November 18, 2006, in Ottawa, Canada at Artists' Centre D'Artistes Ottawa Inc.(Gallery 101) called ALLcreatures. It had featured a taxidermy like installation sculpture called Hunt and the hunted, made using packing tape and created life sized deer and coyotes that were hollow, which were attached to one another and were suspended from a ceiling with a light emanating from the center of the ceiling where the sculpture was suspended from causing the coyotes and deer to look see through. The installation artwork Hannan created deals with the ideas of death and transcendence with how the piece hangs from the ceiling with hollow and see through animals.

=== Faunamorphic ===
Faunamorphic was one of Hannan's exhibitions which was open from July 3 to August 15, 2019, in the Art Gallery of Southwestern Manitoba, in Brandon, Manitoba. The pieces displayed in Faunamorphic were either sculptures or paintings of animals with contorted or distorted features. A wolves thigh of one of the pieces displayed is detailed well with its muscle tone however, the thigh is distorted and entwines upwards and transforms into something that is neither human or animal. Hannan mentioned that the artworks deal with his traditional heritage with the perspective of his urban sensibility, however he does not know what exactly his works are transforming into, it was also his first work that used wolves, in past works he had generally only used deer and coyotes which are more prevalent in Toronto.

==== Untitled, 2004 and Untitled, 2009 ====
The two works featured in this Faunamorphic, Untitled, 2004 and Untitled, 2009, were sculpted as isolated limbs or bodies and reference vulnerability.

==== Pile, 2009 ====
Pile, featured in Faunamorphic, uses taxidermy deer-head forms that had been aged and arranged into a delicate stack, the outside of the artificial heads have corrosion while in the inside there is small green stems on the inside referencing the idea of outside decay and internal.

== List of exhibitions ==
=== Solo exhibitions ===
"DOUBLEcurve", Thunder Bay Art Gallery, Thunder Bay, 2005

"WILDness", The Station Gallery, Whitby, 2004

"David Hannan new works", Galerie St. Laurent+Hill, Ottawa, 2004

"Cross Fire", Indian and Inuit Art Gallery, Gatineau, and Urban Shaman Gallery, Winnipeg, 2000

"Hidden Heroes", Gallery 101, Ottawa, 1998.

=== Group exhibitions ===
"Remix: New Modernities in a Post Indian World", Heard Museum, Phoenix, 2007

"Everyday Light", Thunder Bay Art Gallery, Thunder Bay, 2005

"Transitions", Taipei Fine Arts Museum, 1999, Waikato Museum of Art, Hamilton, New Zealand, 1997, and the Canadian Cultural Centre at the Canadian Embassy, Paris, 1997

"Traces of Colour", McMichael Canadian Art Collection, Kleinburg, 2001

"Comfort Zones: textiles in the Canadian landscape", Textile Museum of Canada, Toronto, 2001

"Rielisms", The Winnipeg Art Gallery, Winnipeg, and The Dunlop Gallery, Regina, 2001.
