= Susanna Blunt =

Canadian portrait artist

- Born: 1941 (age 84–85); Harbin, China
- Known for: Artist

Susanna Blunt (b. 1941) is a Canadian portrait artist who designed the last portrait of Queen Elizabeth II on the former Canadian coinage, issued from 2003 until the monarch's death in 2023. She was the second Canadian woman to design a portrait of a monarch; the first being Dora de Pedery-Hunt. Her work has also appeared at the Royal Academy of Arts.

== Early life and education ==
She was born in Harbin, China, above the HSBC bank where her parents worked. Blunt started her studies at the Banff School of Fine Arts as a teenager. After finishing high school at Queen Margaret's School she had a year of private lessons in Victoria, British Columbia. She moved to London, England and did four years of art school at the Byam Shaw School of Art in Kensington, then won a scholarship to the Royal Academy for another four years, during which she won several awards and a silver medal. The year before graduating, she held her first one-woman show at the now-defunct Canadian Art Gallery in Calgary, Alberta in 1966, and then returned to England to complete the work for her diploma. She returned to Canada and settled in Vancouver in 1970, enrolling at Capilano University to focus on sculpture design.

== Teaching career ==
The following year she worked with Yoko Ono, assisting her with various art projects, later admitting she "disliked her immensely." She then moved to California and started a teaching career, living in the San Francisco Bay area for three years before returning to Vancouver, where she continued teaching in both private and public institutions, including three years on the faculty of the Fine Arts Department at the University of British Columbia.

== Artwork ==
She became known for her trompe-l'œil paintings and designed the optical illusion room for the Science World museum in Vancouver in 1988. Between 1991 and 1992, while living in France she took part in five shows, group and solo, winning an award in an international competition.

Among the people she has painted are Toni Onley, painter, Vancouver; George Woodcock, author, Vancouver; Stanley Donen, film producer, Los Angeles; and Steven Isserlis, Cellist, London.

She was chosen in a nationwide competition by Gerda Hnatyshyn, wife of Governor-General of Canada Ramon Hnatyshyn, to paint her portrait for Rideau Hall in Ottawa, Ontario. In 1997, she painted and delivered to Buckingham Palace a portrait of Prince Edward a portrait arrangement made possible by her friend Christian Cardell Corbet.

Blunt was invited by the Royal Canadian Mint to join eight other artists in a nationwide competition for a new portrait of Queen Elizabeth II to be used on Canadian coins. Blunt created the image from a photograph of the Queen. She won the competition and her portrait of the Queen has been used on coins and currency in Canada from 2003 to 2023.
