= Dora de Pedery-Hunt =

Hungarian-Canadian medallist (1913–2008)

Dora de Pédery
- Born: November 16, 1913; Budapest, Hungary
- Died: September 29, 2008 (aged 94); Toronto, Ontario
- Education: Hungarian University of Fine Arts, Budapest, Hungary, until 1943
- Spouse: Vela Hunt
- Awards: Member in 1966, Royal Canadian Academy; Canada Council grant (1958); Centennial Medal (1967); Honorary LL.D., York University (1983)

Dora de Pédery-Hunt, OC OOnt RCA LL.D. (16 November 1913 – 29 September 2008) was a Hungarian-Canadian sculptor who designed over 600 medals and coins. She was the first Canadian citizen to sculpt the image of Queen Elizabeth II that appeared on Canadian coins between 1990 and 2003.

== Life ==
Dora de Pédery was born in Budapest, Hungary on 16 November 1913 to Attila and Emilia de Pédery. Her father, Attila, was a scientist and a talented pianist, and her mother regularly sang and told stories to Dora and her two sisters. The family focused on music, schooling, and reading, and the children were encouraged to cultivate their ambitions and talents. Dora initially studied physics, medicine and architecture before choosing art as her intended vocation at the age of 24. She trained for six years with scholarships at what is now the Hungarian University of Fine Arts, Budapest, studying under Elek Lux, Béla Ohmann, and József Reményi. She received her Masters Diploma in Sculpture in 1943.

After German forces occupied Hungary in March 1944, her family decided to flee west to Helmstedt, Germany, fearing the Soviet advance from the east. Eight months later, they arrived in Hannover, where her father found work, but it was not long before its fall to the Allied forces.

Five years later, through the sponsorship of Major Thomas S. Chutter and his family, she immigrated to Canada. She arrived in Toronto and worked as a family's live-in housekeeper for a year. She then became a high school art teacher, a job for which she often walked eight kilometres. She also did odd jobs such as "painting designs on children's furniture, cleaning artists' studios and making Christmas decorations for friends and gift shops."

In 1949, she married Vela Hunt. He was a Hungarian journalist and they knew each other previously in Hannover. They divorced in 1961.

== Death ==
She died from colorectal cancer in Toronto, Ontario on 29 September 2008.

== Work ==
Maybe, after all, these limitations are necessary. I welcome these odds - my medals are the result of a good fight against them - and at the end at least I can look back on a bravely fought battle.

— Dora de Pédery-Hunt

After getting married, de Pédery-Hunt spent the next seven years using her free time to work on her sculpting on her kitchen table. In 1956 she made a large artificial stone portrait of Frances Loring, her friend and a fellow sculptor. She entered the portrait in the CNE art show, where it was seen by Alan Jarvis, who was serving as director of the National Gallery of Canada. Jarvis, who was also a trained professional sculptor, saw the merit of de Pédery-Hunt's piece and played a major role in its purchase for a permanent collection at NGC. Their purchase was her first Canadian sale of sculpture.

Her art turned toward a special interest in making medallions since she often did small-scale sculpting. With Jarvis's encouragement, she applied for Canada Council assistance. She thereafter received a grant in 1958 to study medals displayed in various European galleries, museums, and cathedrals. She decided to focus on the neglected art of medal-making upon her return to Toronto, and her first commission was to make a Canada Council medal for excellence in the arts, humanities, and social sciences. She created a cast bronze medallion that was ten centimetres in diameter in 1961; on it, she was able to portray music, dance, literature, painting, and sculpture.

In 1963, she was elected to the Ontario Society of Artists. She was a founding member of the Canadian Portrait Academy and the Medallic Art Society of Canada. On numerous occasions, she represented Canada as a Delegate to the International Art Medal Federation FIDEM, with which she was affiliated since 1965. She had various other affiliations: She was elected to the Sculptors Society of Canada in 1953. She was a member of Royal Canadian Academy of Arts since 1967. She was also a member of the Hungarian Society of Applied Art and the Hungarian Women's Fine Art Association.

Her career as an artist also included teaching; she taught sculpture at Toronto's Northern Vocational School from 1949 to 1960, at the Women's Art Association in 1956, and at the Ontario College of Art in 1957.

She created the effigy of Queen Elizabeth II that was used on Canadian coinage in 1990.

Her medal design of Sir Donald Alexander Smith was used by Canada Post as a six cent postage stamp. Two of her portraits of Dr. Frances Loring are in the collection of the National Gallery of Canada.

Over the span of her career, she designed over 600 medals. Additionally, she created a series of small bronze sculptures commemorating Canadian heroes and heroines, and many other works which can be viewed in collections in over 70 major museums worldwide.

In 2025, the National Gallery of Canada organized an exhibition titled In Relief: The Work of Dora de Pédery-Hunt (1913–2008) to honour de Pédery-Hunt’s outstanding contribution to Canadian art. It included the Dora de Pédery-Hunt fonds: a 2023 gift from Dora’s niece, Ildikó Hencz.

== Royal Canadian Mint coins ==
Besides the effigy of Queen Elizabeth II, various Royal Canadian Mint gold coins with a face value of one hundred dollars were designed.

| Year | Theme | Finish | Mintage | Issue Price |
|---|---|---|---|---|
| 1976 | Olympic Commemorative | Proof | 650,000 | $105.00 |
| 1976 | Olympic Commemorative (22k) | Proof | 350,000 | $150.00 |
| 1986 | International Year of Peace | Proof | 76,255 | $325.00 |

== Notable medallions ==
- Inco 1st nickel production medallion: Thompson, Manitoba, Canada (1961)
- Susanna and the Elders (1961)
- Head of Virgin Mary (1963)
- Head of Christ (1963)
- Dante (1965)
- Dante and Beatrice (1965)
- Medal for the 100th birthday of The National Archives of Canada (1963)
- Norman Bethune Medal for presentation to Mao Zedong by Pierre Trudeau in 1973.
- The J. B. Harkin medal for the Canadian Parks and Wilderness Society
- Canadian Government official medal for Expo 70 in Osaka, Japan
- John Drainie Award medal for the Association of Canadian Television and Radio Artists
- The Reach for the Top Award for the Canadian Broadcasting Corporation
- The 1981 Canadian Numismatic Association Convention Medal
- The A. J. Casson Award for the Canadian Society of Painters in Water Colour, in 1991.
- With the collaboration of the Toronto Historical Society, she designed a medal for the city of Toronto's bicentennial in *1993.
- The Ontario Association of Architects' Raymore Medal, given each year to the intern architect attaining the highest marks on the annual professional licensure exams.
- Norman Bethune Medal for presentation to China by Justin Trudeau in 2016.

== Awards ==
de Pédery-Hunt's awards include:

- Centennial Medal (1967)
- Officer of Order of Canada (1974)
- Honorary LL.D., York University (1983)
