= Symbols of Alberta =

Symbols of Canadian province

Alberta is one of Canada's provinces, and has established several official emblems that reflect the province's history, its natural and diverse landscapes, and its people.

== Official symbols of Alberta ==
	Symbol	Image	Adopted	Remarks
Coat of arms	Coat of arms of Alberta	Coat of arms of Alberta	1907, augmented July 30, 1980.	Granted to Alberta by Royal Warrant.
Motto	Fortis et liber (English: Strong and Free)		July 30, 1980	Granted with other elements of the coat of arms. A reference to the fifth line of O Canada.
Provincial shield	Provincial shield of Alberta	Shield of arms of Alberta	September 2013	The shield of the coat of arms was adopted as a separate official emblem known as the provincial shield in September 2013.
Flag	Flag of Alberta	Alberta	June 1, 1968	Adopted on June 1, 1968, the flag shows the provincial shield of Alberta on a blue background. The flag is proportioned twice as long as it is high.
Provincial colours	Alberta Blue and Alberta Gold		1984	The colours can be found on the flag and on other provincial insignia.
Floral	Wild rose (Rosa acicularis)	Wild rose	1930	It grows in almost all regions of the province.
Tree	Lodgepole pine (Pinus contorta latifolia)	Lodgepole pine	May 30, 1984, due to the efforts of the Junior Forest Warden Association of Alberta.	It was used in the early 1900s for the production of railway ties, and is as a resource for the production of poles, posts, pulp and plywood in Alberta's forestry industry.
Grass	Rough fescue (Festuca scabrella)	Festuca	April 30, 2003, due to the efforts of the Prairie Conservation Forum.	
Stone	Petrified wood	Petrified wood	1977, due to the efforts of the Alberta Federation of Rock Clubs.	Of Cretaceous and Paleocene ages, it is often found in gravel pits in Alberta.
Gemstone	Ammolite	Ammolite	As of 2022, bill still awaiting Royal assent	Made from fossilized shells and Southern Alberta is the only known location where it reaches gem quality levels. Bill to recognize it as the official gemstone was introduced in 2004 Official gemstone of the City of Lethbridge since 2007. Formally adopted by the Alberta legislature in 2022.
Mammal	Rocky mountain bighorn sheep (Ovis canadensis)	Bighorn sheep	August 18, 1989	The bighorn is a native Alberta mammal. Prehistoric remains have been found in most of the river valleys across Alberta, showing that some of the largest herds of Rocky Mountain bighorn sheep once roamed the province. Today the bighorn is primarily found in the Rocky Mountain region.
Fish	Bull trout (Salvelinus confluentus)	Bull trout	May 2, 1995	Catch and release policy regulates all bull trout fishing in Alberta.
Bird	Great horned owl (Bubo virginianus)	Great horned owl	May 3, 1977, by a province-wide children's vote.	It is found throughout Alberta in forests and grasslands.
Tartan	Alberta tartan		1961, due to the efforts of the Edmonton Rehabilitation Society for the Handicapped, now Goodwill Industries of Alberta.	Green, gold, blue, pink and black, for forests, wheat fields, skies and lakes, wild rose and coal and petroleum respectively.
Tartan	Alberta dress tartan		2000	Large sections of white, a symbol of Alberta's clean and bright snowy days. It can be worn for dancing, special occasions and formal attire.
Anthem	"Alberta"		September 2004	Written by Mary Kieftenbeld, and adopted as the official provincial song in preparation for the province's centennial celebrations in 2005.
Order	Alberta Order of Excellence	Ribbon of the Alberta Order of Excellence	1979	Intended to honour current or former Alberta residents for conspicuous achievements in any field, the Alberta Order of Excellence is the highest honour conferred by the province.
Medal	Alberta Centennial Medal	Ribbon of the Alberta Centennial Medal	March 24, 2005	Intended to honor Albertans who have made significant contributions to their fellow citizens, their community and to the province.
Mace	The Mace of Alberta		It replaced the old version on February 9, 1956.	It is the symbol of the authority of the Legislative Assembly of Alberta. It is a ceremonial staff carried by the Sergeant-at-Arms into the Chamber. It was designed by L.B. Blain in Edmonton, and built by English silversmith Joseph Fray in Birmingham.
Francophone flag	Franco-Albertan flag (French: Drapeau franco-albertain)		June 24, 2017	Adopted by the Association canadienne-française de l'Alberta (French-Canadian Association of Alberta) in March 1982 after winning a contest sponsored by Francophonie jeunesse de l'Alberta (Francophone Youth of Alberta). On June 14, 2017, Alberta's French Policy officially recognized the flag as a "Symbol of Distinction under the Emblems of Alberta Act".

== De facto symbols ==
While not officially adopted through legislation as emblems by the government of Alberta, these places and things are popularly associated with (hence could be considered symbols of) the province.

	Symbol	Image	Remarks
Legislative building	Alberta Legislative Building		Completed in 1913, it is the seat of the Legislative Assembly of Alberta.
Official residence	Government House		The former official residence of the lieutenant governors of Alberta. The restored and repurposed building is currently used by the Alberta provincial government for ceremonial events, conferences, and some official meetings of the caucus.
Logo	Provincial signature	Alberta wordmark	Introduced in 2009 as part of Brand Alberta.
Logo	Provincial wordmark (1972–2009)	Alberta wordmark	Introduced in 1972 and used by Executive Council of Alberta as well as the Legislative Assembly of Alberta on all official documents. It uses a specific typeface, and is also showcased on signs such as highway shields. Still in found in use.
Logo	Provincial wordmark	Alberta wordmark	Introduced in 1960s.
Highway shield	Standard highway markers for Alberta	Alberta Primary Highway Route Marker Alberta Secondary Highway Route Marker	Alberta's provincial highway network is signed using standard highway markers along its 31,000 kilometers (19,000 mi) of paved roads.
Vehicle registration plate	Standard Alberta licence plate	Alberta licence plate	The current white, red and blue base was introduced in late 1983, with the new Alberta logo being added in July 2019. Only rear plates have been required since 1992.
Law enforcement agency	Alberta Sheriffs Branch	Alberta Sheriffs Branch Badge Sheriff Van	While not a provincial police service like Ontario, Quebec or Newfoundland, the Alberta Sheriffs are provincial law enforcement agency. Rural policing is done by a combination of the RCMP and the Sheriff Highway Patrol.
Coin	Alberta centennial quarter coin		In 2005, to celebrate the centennial of Alberta, a commemorative quarter was issued by the Royal Canadian Mint. There were four candidate designs for the Alberta quarter: Big Sky Country, Alberta's Natural Beauty, A Dynamic Century, and Rocky Mountain Bighorn Sheep. The winning design was Big Sky Country, by Michelle Grant, and depicted an oil derrick with cattle grazing at its base.
Coin	125th anniversary of Confederation		In 1992, to celebrate the 125th anniversary of Confederation, the Mint released a commemorative coin depicting the Alberta badlands.
Dinosaur	Albertosaurus (/ælˌbɜːrtəˈsɔːrəs/; meaning "Alberta lizard")	Albertasaurus	Named by Henry Fairfield Osborn, honouring Alberta, established the same year in which the first remains were found. Almost three-quarters of all remains have been discovered alongside the Red Deer River near Drumheller. The Albertosaurus is featured on the latest issue of the Alberta driver's licence, introduced in 2018.
Fungus	Red cap mushroom (Leccinum boreale)	Red cap mushroom	An amendment introduced to the Emblems of Alberta Act, as proposed in March 2009 was approved by Members of the Legislative Assembly.
Sport	Rodeo	Bucking horse at the Calgary Stampede	Commonly associated with Alberta, rodeo is particularly popular in the province. The first rodeo in Canada was held in 1902 in Raymond, Alberta, and the Calgary Stampede, a ten-day event billing itself as "the greatest outdoor show on Earth," attracts over one million visitors per year and features one of the world's largest rodeos. There is a bill before the Legislative Assembly of Alberta that will make American rodeo the official sport of the province. However, enabling legislation has yet to be passed, and this has not been without criticism and opposition from animal rights and some animal welfare advocates.

== See also ==
- List of Canadian provincial and territorial symbols
- Canadian royal symbols
