= Quarter (Canadian coin) =

Canadian coin worth 25 cents

Twenty-five cents
- Canada
- Value: 0.25 Canadian dollar
- Mass: 4.4 g
- Diameter: 23.88 mm
- Thickness: 1.58 mm
- Edge: Milled
- Composition: Nickel-plated steel 94% steel, 3.8% Cu, 2.2% Ni plating
- Years of minting: 1870–present

Obverse
- Design: Charles III, King of Canada
- Designer: Steven Rosati
- Design date: 2023

Reverse
- Design: Caribou
- Designer: Emanuel Hahn
- Design date: 1937

In Canada, a quarter, short for quarter dollar, is a coin worth 25 cents, equal to 1/4 of a Canadian dollar. It is a small, circular coin of silver colour. According to the Royal Canadian Mint, the official name for the coin is the 25-cent piece, but in practice, it is usually called a quarter, much like its American counterpart. In Canadian French, it is called a caribou. The coin is produced at the mint's facility in Winnipeg, Manitoba.

== History ==
=== Early coinage (1870–1910) ===
The first coinage minted for what would later become the Canadian Confederation originated in legislation enacted in 1853. Per the Act 16 Vict. c. 158, the Province of Canada was to issue "dollars, cents, and mills" that would co-circulate with English shillings and pence. While bronze and silver coins were initially struck at the Royal Mint in 1858, these only included currency up to twenty-cents. When the first coinage for the Dominion of Canada was struck in 1870, only silver coins were issued, which included a twenty-five cent piece in substitution for the twenty-cent coin. This denomination change brought the new monetary system, which was based on the United States gold dollar concurrently with the British sovereign, into conformity with the United States quarter. In a related event, the Canadian government also issued twenty-five cent notes to provide the country with fractional currency. By doing so, this relieved the "strain consequent" upon the removal from circulation of United States silver.

Canadian quarters initially weighed 5.810 grams (89.66 gr) and were roughly 24 millimetres (0.94 in) in diameter with a plain edge. The obverse featured a portrait of Queen Victoria (designed by Leonard C. Wyon) wearing a tiara, while the reverse had the denomination and date under a crown within a wreath. Public opinion of this new coin was positive as the American Journal of Numismatics and Bulletin of American Numismatic and Archæological Societies noted that the quarter was considered "more convenient than the old twenty cent piece". In 1871, two varieties of quarters co-circulated: those without a mintmark were made by the Royal Mint, while "H" marked coins were made in Birmingham, England, by Ralph Heaton & Sons. Heaton & Sons continued to mint only "H" marked quarters for 1872. No quarters were struck by the Royal Mint or Heaton for Canada in 1873 as there was an increased demand for "Imperial coinage". Heaton continued to mint quarters for Canada afterward from 1874 to 1883. There was a four-year hiatus during this period as the coins were transitioned from a plain to a milled edge.

Enlargements to the facilities at the Royal Mint were completed in 1883, which meant they could handle Canadian coin production. Quarters that date from 1884 to 1889 were all struck at the Royal Mint in London before Heaton was called for again. The Numismatic and Antiquarian Society of Montreal commented in their entry for 1890 that this choice indicated that there was a rush of business at the Royal Mint that year. Coinage returned to the Royal Mint in 1891 and Canadian quarters were struck there through the remainder of Queen Victoria's reign. When Edward VII ascended to the throne in 1901, a new obverse portrait for the quarter was used. British medalist George William de Saulles designed a right-facing bust of the king surrounded by the words "Edwardus VII Dei gratia Rex Imperator". Canadian quarters continued to be struck in England until 1907 with the opening of the Ottawa Mint. When Edward VII died in 1910, a controversy arose in the following year with a new portrait design for George V.

=== Georgian coinage (1911–1952) ===
King George V's portrait was designed by Australian sculptor and medalist Bertram Mackennal with the words "Georgius V Rex et Ind:Imp:"; however, this was criticized by the public as the decision to omit "Dei gratia" (by the grace of God) was called "godless" and "graceless". As a result, the words Dei gra were added into the design the following year. On May 11, 1920, a new coinage act was put into place that affected the amount of silver in the quarter. While the previous "British standard" fineness of .925 silver (sterling) was reduced to .800, the weight and diameter of the quarter remained the same. This act was put into place as the price of silver had risen due to the aftermath of World War I. No quarters were minted between 1921 and 1927 as the rising price of silver made them unprofitable. When quarter production resumed in 1927, the Royal Canadian Mint initially planned to strike commemorative coins to celebrate Canada's 60th anniversary. Although a winning design was chosen for the quarter, it was never used as the plan was scrapped.

No more proposed changes to the quarter were made during the remaining years of King George V's reign. When he died in January 1936, his son Edward VIII assumed the throne but soon abdicated in December 1936. After his brother George VI assumed the throne on December 11, 1936, a new effigy was needed for Canadian coinage. As it was late in the year, the Royal Mint could not immediately make coins with a die depicting the new king with a 1937 date. It was instead decided by the mint to continue minting 1936 dated quarters with a dot added below the date on the reverse which signified that they were made in 1937. The new effigy of George VI was designed by Humphrey Paget and was ready for use later in the year. The king is shown on the obverse side facing left, with the inscription "Georgius VI D:G: Rex Et Ind:Imp:". During this time, new reverse designs were also planned for circulating denominations below fifty cents. Initial proposals included a caribou design for the five-cent coin, a beaver design for the ten-cent coin, and the Bluenose for the twenty-five-cent coin. After some debate, the head of a caribou was designed by Canadian sculptor Emanuel Hahn for the quarter.

India's declaration of independence in 1947 affected the quarter, as the words Ind:Imp: (Emperor of India) had to be removed from the obverse of the coin. This change was made under article 7.2 of the Parliament of the United Kingdom's Indian Independence Act 1947. As the dies omitting the title were not immediately ready for use, a small maple leaf was added next to the 1947 dated coins on the reverse for quarters minted into 1948. King George VI died in 1952 and a new obverse effigy featuring Queen Elizabeth II appeared in the following year.

=== Elizabeth II (1953–1989) ===
The first effigy of Queen Elizabeth II was designed by sculptor and medalist Mary Gillick, who chose to depict the queen at 27 years old facing right. As with the previous monarchs, her effigy is surrounded with Latin text which reads "Elizabeth II Dei Gratia Regina" (Elizabeth II, by the grace of God, Queen). For Canadian coinage, this marked the first time that master dies were made at the Royal Canadian Mint. During production, the diameter of the quarter was increased from 23.6 to 23.9 millimetres (0.929 to 0.941 in). (Note: These numbers are rounded.) For reasons unknown, these were also struck in two major varieties, "with a shoulder fold" and "without a shoulder fold" (or strap) on the new effigy. While quarters dated 1954 have a low mintage, an increased demand for small change (felt most with dimes and quarters) boosted production by 50% in the following year. In 1964, Queen Elizabeth approved a second effigy of herself on Canadian coinage which was made by British artist and sculptor Arnold Machin. This second bust features the Queen facing right while wearing a tiara surrounded by Latin text where "Dei Gratia" is abbreviated again to read "D.G."

When silver prices rose sharply in the mid-1960s, the Canadian government initially set 1966 as a proposed transition year for an alternative alloy for coinage. This proposed year in actuality is when a government committee was formed on the matter and nickel was chosen to replace silver. Two major events regarding the Canadian quarter occurred in 1967. During this year Canada celebrated its centennial with special circulating commemoratives. According to James A. Haxby of the Royal Canadian Mint, a prowling bobcat was chosen for the centennial quarter to express "intelligent independence and decisive action". At the same time, the silver content was lowered from 80% to 50% by a proclamation which was authorized on August 17, 1967. This mid-year change meant that two varieties were produced that differ in their silver content. A similar event occurred in 1968 as the quarter was transitioned from 50% silver to pure nickel.

The caribou design continued to be used until 1973 when the quarter got a special commemorative design which honored the centennial of the Royal Canadian Mounted Police. During this time, Queen Elizabeth's obverse bust was modified to be slightly smaller. These changes took full effect when the caribou design was restored to the reverse in the following year. Halfway through the decade, in April 1975, Canadian quarters were produced at the newly constructed mint facility in Winnipeg. Although nickel was by then dominant, silver quarters of both amounts (50% and 80%) continued to circulate until at least 1979. It was estimated by the mid-1980s that it cost the mint five cents to produce a nickel-alloyed quarter.

=== Elizabeth II / Charles III (1990–present) ===
In 1990, a third effigy of the Queen was used for Canadian quarters, designed by Hungarian-Canadian sculptor Dora de Pedery-Hunt. This third design depicts Elizabeth II when she was 64 years old surrounded by the previously used Latin script. The lowest mintage of any circulated quarter post–World War II occurred in 1991 as the Royal Canadian Mint prepared resources for the following year. For this event, Canada celebrated its 125th anniversary in 1992 by minting twelve circulating commemorative quarters. The caribou design returned for quarters minted from 1993 to 1996 until production ceased in the following year. Quarter production resumed in 1999 with the millennium series, which included a circulating commemorative quarter for every month until December 2000.

The Royal Canadian Mint also concurrently minted quarters with the caribou design in two different compositions. As nickel prices were steadily rising during this time, experimental steel-plated test coins were sent to vending companies. These coins were marked with a "P" (plated) below Elizabeth's obverse bust for identification purposes. When the Royal Canadian Mint discovered that their experimental coins had somehow made their way into circulation, they issued 20,000 sets of "1999 P" coins for collectors. The last quarters made of pure nickel were minted for 2001 before nickel-plated steel production became permanent.

Elizabeth II was honoured on the quarter in 2002 as the coins carried a dual date of "1952–2002", for her Golden Jubilee. Two effigies of the Queen were used in the following year which include Hunt's "old effigy", and a fourth and final effigy made by portrait artist Susanna Blunt. This final depiction of the Queen shows a right-facing uncrowned bust with the same previously used Latin script.

Circulating commemorative quarters for various events were produced off and on again from 2005 to 2017 alongside those with the caribou design. Those dated after 2006 feature the RCM logo which replaced the "P" (plated) mark below the Queen's bust. After Elizabeth II died in 2022, an effigy of her son Charles III was designed by Canadian artist Steven Rosati. This current bust was introduced in 2023 and features the King facing left surrounded by the Latin script: "Charles III D.G. Rex".

== Composition and size ==
Years	Mass	Diameter	Composition
1870–1910	5.81 g (0.205 oz)	23.62 mm (0.930 in)	92.5% silver, 7.5% copper
1910–1919	5.83 g (0.206 oz)	23.62 mm (0.930 in)	92.5% silver, 7.5% copper
1920–1952	5.83 g (0.206 oz)	23.62 mm (0.930 in)	80% silver, 20% copper
1953–1967	5.83 g (0.206 oz)	23.88 mm (0.940 in)	80% silver, 20% copper
1967–1968	5.05 g (0.178 oz)	23.88 mm (0.940 in)	50% silver, 50% copper
1968–2001	5.05 g (0.178 oz)	23.88 mm (0.940 in)	99.9% nickel
2001–present	4.40 g (0.155 oz)	23.88 mm (0.940 in)	94.0% steel, (Note: The steel used for manufacturing is patented as: "AISI 1006 alloy".) 3.8% copper, 2.2% nickel plating

== Circulation figures ==
=== Victoria & Edward VII ===
Year	Mintage (Note: These figures include the 1872: inverted "A" for "V" in Victoria, the 1880: "narrow" and "wide" 0, and 1906: "large" and rare "small" crown varieties.)
1870	900,000
1871	400,000
1871 H (Note: The "H" on the coin refers to "Ralph Heaton & Sons".)	748,000
1872 H	2,240,000
1874 H	1,600,000
1875 H	1,000,000
1880 H	400,000
1881 H	820,000
1882 H	600,000
1883 H	960,000
1885	192,000
1886	540,000
1887	100,000
1888	400,000
1889	66,324
1890 H	200,000
1891	120,000
1892	510,000
1893	100,000
1894	220,000
1899	415,580
1900	1,320,000
1901 Victoria	640,000
1902 Edward VII	464,000
1902 H	800,000
1903	846,150
1904	400,000
1905	800,000
1906	1,237,843
1907	2,088,000
1908	495,016
1909	1,335,929
1910	3,577,569

=== George V & George VI ===
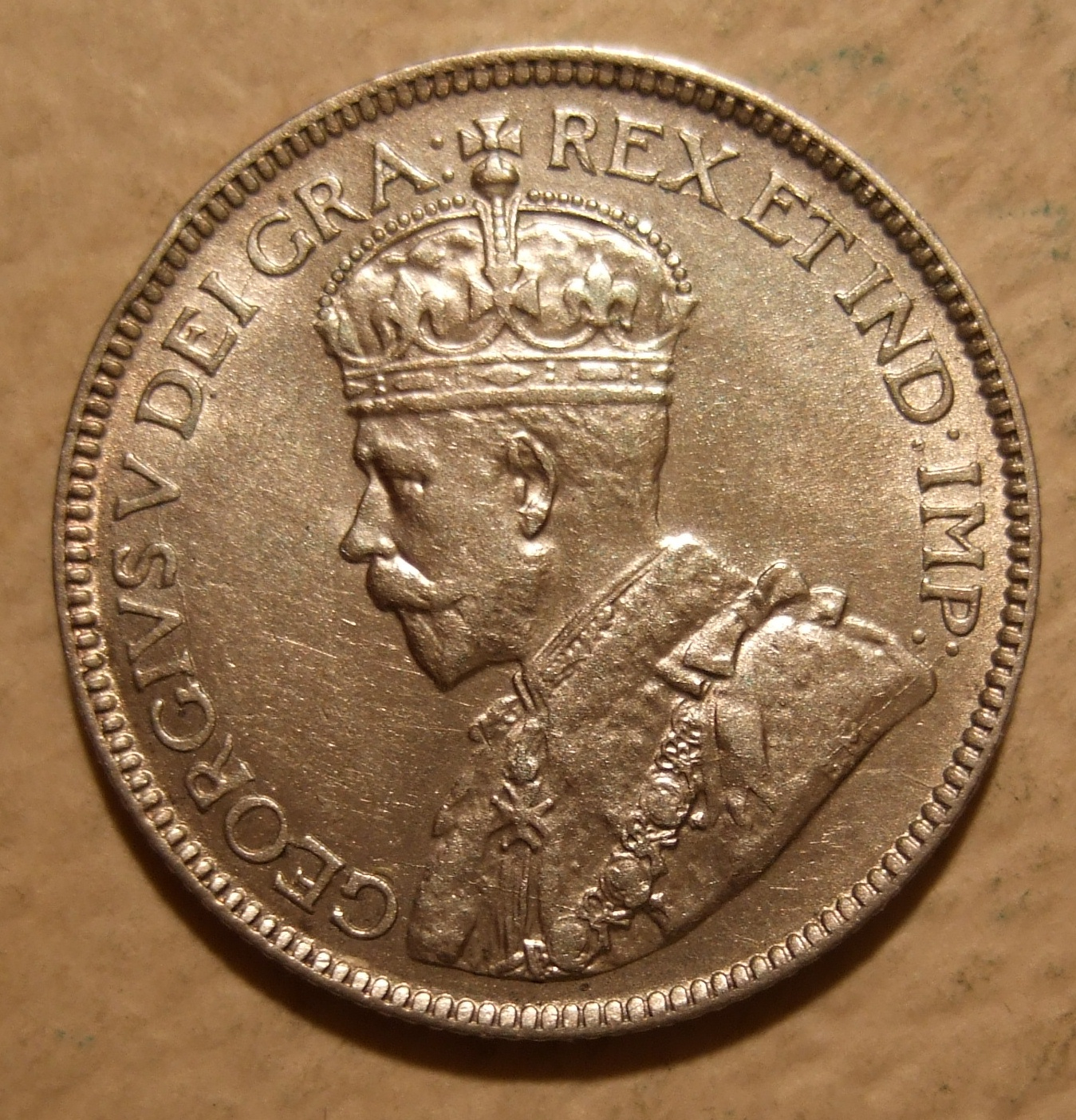
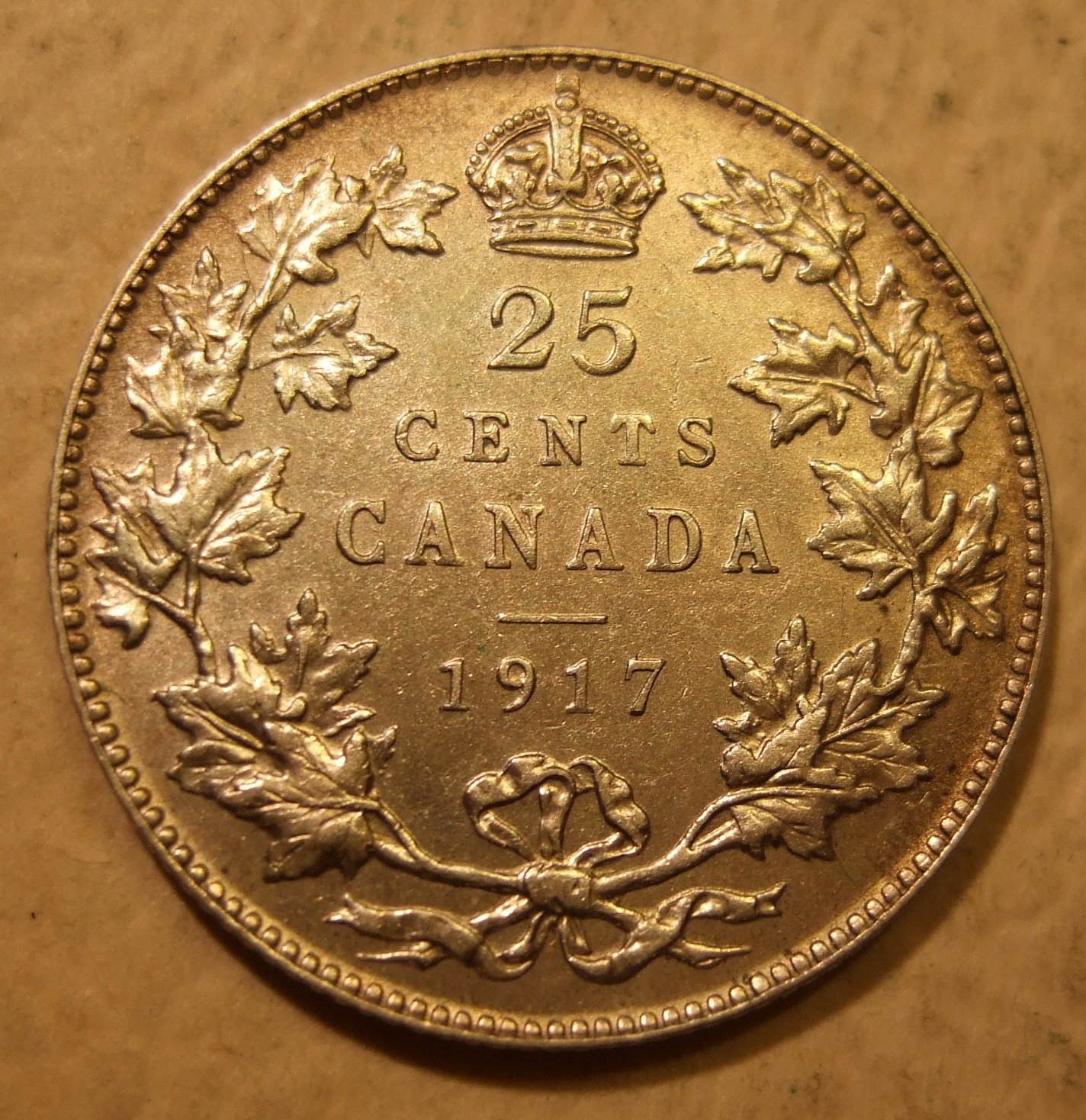
A 1917 quarter featuring King George V

Year	Mintage
1911 – No "Dei gratia" (Note: The words "Dei gratia" were removed from the obverse of the coin to make room for "Ind:Imp:" (Emperor of India). It was restored in 1912 after public backlash.)	1,721,341
1912 – With "Dei gra."	2,544,199
1913	2,213,595
1914	1,215,397
1915	242,382
1916	1,462,566
1917	3,365,644
1918	4,175,649
1919	5,852,262
1920	1,975,278
1921	597,337
1927	468,096
1928	2,114,178
1929	2,690,562
1930	968,748
1931	537,815
1932	537,994
1933	421,282
1934	384,350
1935	537,772
1936 George V	972,094
1936 George V (dot) (Note: This coin has a "dot" below the wreath on the reverse.)	153,322
1937 George VI	2,689,813
1938	3,149,245
1939	3,532,495
1940	9,583,650
1941	6,654,672
1942	6,935,871
1943	13,559,575
1944	7,216,237
1945	5,296,495
1946	2,210,810
1947 (Note: Three different varieties were created during this year. There are 1947 dated quarters, 1947 dated quarters with a "dot after 7" (in 1947), and those with a maple leaf after the "7". Maple leaf coins omit "IND: IMP:" aka Indiae Imperator (Emperor of India) on the obverse.)	1,524,554
1947 ML	4,393,938
1948	2,564,424
1949	7,988,630
1950	9,673,335
1951	8,290,710
1952	8,859,642

=== Elizabeth II ===
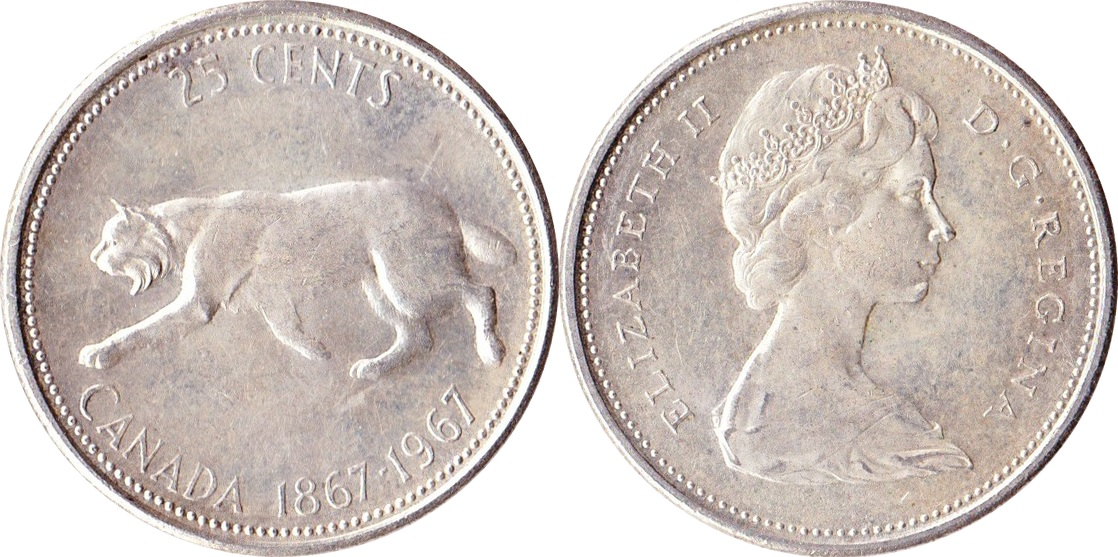
Canadian Centennial quarter

Year	Mintage (Note: Unless mentioned otherwise, all of these quarters feature a Caribou on the reverse.)	Notes
1953 No strap	10,546,769	These varieties are also referred to as "with shoulder fold" and "without shoulder fold".
1953 Strap	10,546,769	These varieties are also referred to as "with shoulder fold" and "without shoulder fold".
1954	2,318,891	
1955	9,552,505	
1956	11,269,353	
1957	12,770,190	
1958	9,336,910	
1959	13,503,461	
1960	22,835,327	
1961	18,164,368	
1962	29,559,266	
1963	21,180,652	
1964	36,479,343	1st obverse portrait
1965	44,708,869	2nd obverse portrait
1966	25,626,315	
1967 80% silver	48,855,500	These quarters feature a Canadian Lynx on the reverse, and are dated 1867–1967 to reflect the Canadian Centennial. The mintage figure includes both 80% and 50% silver coins.
1967 50% silver	48,855,500	These quarters feature a Canadian Lynx on the reverse, and are dated 1867–1967 to reflect the Canadian Centennial. The mintage figure includes both 80% and 50% silver coins.
1968 50% silver	71,464,000	
1968 nickel	88,686,931	
1969	133,037,929	
1970	10,302,010	
1971	48,170,428	
1972	43,743,387	
1973 Large bust	134,958,587	Quarters dated 1973 have "large" and "small" bust varieties of Queen Elizabeth II on the obverse while the reverse depicts a mounted RCMP officer.
1973 Small bust	134,958,587	Quarters dated 1973 have "large" and "small" bust varieties of Queen Elizabeth II on the obverse while the reverse depicts a mounted RCMP officer.
1974	192,360,598	
1975	141,148,000	
1976	86,898,261	
1977	99,634,555	
1978	176,475,408	
1979	131,042,905	
1980	76,178,000	
1981	131,580,272	
1982	171,926,000	
1983	13,162,000	
1984	121,668,000	
1985	158,734,000	
1986	132,220,000	
1987	53,408,000	
1988	80,368,473	
1989	119,796,307	2nd obverse portrait
1990	31,258,000	3rd obverse portrait
1991	459,000	Production was low this year as resources were prepared for the following year's commemorative coins.
1992	—N/a	To celebrate the 125th anniversary of Confederation, the Royal Canadian Mint released twelve commemorative coins. The Royal Canadian Mint struck no quarters with the caribou design.
1993	73,758,000	
1994	77,670,000	
1995	89,210,000	
1996	28,106,000	
1997	Not circulated	
1998	Not circulated	Commermorative quarters dated "1998" were made to celebrate the 90th anniversary of the Royal Canadian Mint
1999 caribou	258,888,000	An estimated 20,000 quarters are dated 1999 (P).
2000 caribou	434,087,000	Only 3 to 5 2000 (P) quarters are known.
2001 caribou	8,415,000	Struck in nickel
2001 P	55,773,000	Struck in nickel-plated steel (P)
2002 P	156,105,000	
2002 P (GJ)	152,485,000	Dated 1952–2002 to reflect Elizabeth II's Golden Jubilee
2003 P Crowned	87,647,000	Crowned 3rd obverse portrait
2003 P Uncrowned	66,861,633	Uncrowned 4th obverse portrait
2004 P	177,466,000	
2005 P	206,346,000	
2006 P	423,189,000	
2007	386,763,000	The nickel-plated steel "P" mark (below bust on obverse) was dropped and replaced by an RCM logo.
2008	387,222,000	
2009	266,766,000	
2010	167,500,000	
2011	212,970,000	
2012	178,450,000	
2013	118,480,000	
2014	97,440,000	
2015	97,320,000	
2016	106,880,000	
2017	110,720,000	
2018	102,560,000	
2019	80,160,000	
2020	96,000,000	
2021	110,560,000	
2022	91,680,000	

=== Charles III ===
Year	Mintage
2023	80,510,000
2024	82,560,000
2025	TBA
