= Quarter (Canadian commemorative coin) =

Canadian coin

Quarter (commemorative)
- Canada
- Value: 0.25 Canadian dollar
- Edge: Reeded
- Composition: Varies by issue
- Years of minting: 1967–present
- Catalog number: -

Obverse
- Design: Varies by year

Reverse
- Design: Varies by year

The quarter, short for quarter dollar, is a Canadian coin worth 25 cents or one-fourth of a Canadian dollar. In addition to being used as circulating currency, this denomination has also been used to make commemorative coins struck by the Royal Canadian Mint. Ordinarily featuring a caribou, the quarter has the most commonly altered reverse in Canada and is the usual venue for commemorative issues. Two main types of commemorative coins have been issued; those for circulation and those for collectors. This article does not cover NFL related commemoratives or Olympic coins as those quarters can be found in their respective pages.

== Circulating commemoratives ==
=== Individual events (C) ===
Year	Theme	Artist	Mintage	Notes
1967	Canada's Centennial	Alex Colville	48,855,500	The reverse features a Canada lynx.
1973	100th anniversary of the Royal Canadian Mounted Police	Paul Cederberg	134,958,587	The reverse depicts a mounted RCMP officer. Obverse features Queen Elizabeth II.
2002	Canada Day	Judith Chartier	30,627,000	The reverse depicts small human figures supporting a large maple leaf.
2004	Acadia (Île Ste. Croix)	R.R. Carmichael, Stan Witten	15,400,000	The reverse depicts a 17th-century sailing ship, La Bonne-Renommée, and the dates 1604–2004.
2004	Remembrance Day	Cosme Saffioti, Stan Witten	28,500,000	The reverse features a corn poppy coloured red, the first coloured general circulation coin in the world. These were also struck in non-circulation issue silver proof for collectors.
2005	Year of the Veteran	Elaine Gobel	29,390,000	The reverse features the conjoined busts of young and old veterans, facing left.
2006	Pink Ribbon	Cosme Saffioti	29,798,000	The second colourized coin in general issue. The colouration is more scratch-resistant.
2006	Medal of Bravery	RCM Engravers	20,040,000	The reverse features the design of a Medal of Bravery: a maple leaf within a wreath
2008	Remembrance Day 90th anniversary	Cosme Saffioti, Stan Witten	11,300,000	Re-issue of 2004 design (but with a superior red poppy process & appearance), with "1918 Armistice" added to commemorate the 90th anniversary of the end of World War I.
2010	65th anniversary of World War II	Cosme Saffioti	10,978,000	Features a soldier with a bowed head and hands on a rifle in front of a maple leaf. Two coloured poppies are on each side of the soldier.
2013	100th anniversary of the Canadian Arctic Expedition	Bonnie Ross	12,500,000	Features two varieties of frosted accents
2013	Life in the North	Tim Pitsiulak	12,500,000	Features two varieties of frosted accents: one with a frosted Bowhead whale and the other with frosted Belugas
2015	50th anniversary of the Canadian flag	Bonnie Ross	12,500,000	Features fifty children holding the flag of Canada. Half were issued colourized.
2015	100th anniversary of the writing of In Flanders Field	Laurie McGaw	12,500,000	Features a poppy. Half were issued colourized.
2017	Canada 150	Joelle Wong	20,000,000	Features a turtle, bird and beaver, all decorated with aboriginal patterns, reaching toward a plant growing out from a pair of hands to symbolize how all Canadians are connected in protecting Canada's future. The theme of the coin is "Canada's Future".
2017	125th anniversary of the Stanley Cup	Steve Hepburn	12,500,000	Features the Stanley Cup, flanked by two hockey players; on the left is a player who would have vied for the trophy in its early days, and on the right is a hockey player from today's era.

=== 1992: 125th anniversary of Confederation ===
In 1992, to celebrate the 125th anniversary of Confederation, the RCM released twelve commemorative coins, one for each Canadian province and territory at the time. These were the inspiration for the US 50 State quarters program of 1999 to 2008. Nunavut, which separated from the Northwest Territories seven years later in 1999, was honoured with a special $2 coin.

Date of Issue	Province/territory	Artist	Mintage	Notes
June 4, 1992	Alberta	Mel Heath	12,133,000	The Alberta badlands
December 9, 1992	British Columbia	Carla Egan	14,001,000	An orca surfacing with the Coast Mountains in the distance
April 7, 1992	Manitoba	Muriel Hope	11,349,000	A Hudson's Bay Company fort
January 9, 1992	New Brunswick	Ronald Lambert	12,174,000	The Oldfields Covered Bridge
March 5, 1992	Newfoundland and Labrador	Christoper Newhook	11,405,000	A fisherman in a dory
February 6, 1992	Northwest Territories	Beth McEachen	12,582,000	An inuksuk
September 9, 1992	Nova Scotia	Bruce Wood	13,600,000	The Peggys Point Lighthouse at Peggy's Cove
August 6, 1992	Ontario	Greg Salmela	14,263,000	A windswept tree on the Canadian Shield
July 7, 1992	Prince Edward Island	Nigel Roe	13,001,000	The province's distinctive coastline
October 1, 1992	Quebec	Romualdas Bukauskas	13,607,000	Sailboats at Percé Rock
November 5, 1992	Saskatchewan	Brian Cobb	14,165,000	Ears of wheat, grain elevators, and a train of Canadian Wheat Board hopper cars
May 7, 1992	Yukon	Libby Dulac	10,388,000	The Kaskawulsh Glacier

=== 1999–2000: millennium quarters ===
In April 1998, the Mint announced the "Millennium Coin Design Contest", a contest open to all Canadians to submit designs for twenty-four millennium quarters, one for each month of 1999 and 2000. The 1999 designs were meant to look back on Canada's past, while the 2000 designs looked to the future. While the 1999 coins were labelled with their month of issue, the 2000 coins were labeled with the relevant theme. All of these quarters were also issued in proof as individuals, and in sets for collectors.

Month	Theme	Artist	Mintage
January 1999	A Country Unfolds	Peter Ka-Kin Poon	12,181,200
February 1999	Etched in Stone	Lonnie Springer	14,469,250
March 1999	The Log Drive	Marjolaine Lavoie	15,033,500
April 1999	Our Northern Heritage	Kenojuak Ashevak	15,446,000
May 1999	The Voyageurs	Sergiy Minenok	15,566,100
June 1999	From Coast to Coast	Gordon Ho	20,432,750
July 1999	A Nation of People	Maria H. Sarkany	17,321,000
August 1999	The Pioneer Spirit	Alzira Botelho	18,153,700
September 1999	Canada Through a Child's Eye	Claudia Bertrand	31,539,350
October 1999	A Tribute to First Nations	Jason Edward Read	32,136,650
November 1999	The Airplane Opens the North	Brian R. Bacon	27,162,800
December 1999	This Is Canada	J.L. Pierre Provencher	43,339,200
January 2000	Pride	Donald F. Warkentin	50,666,800
February 2000	Ingenuity	John Jaciw	36,078,360
March 2000	Achievement	Daryl Ann Dorosz	35,312,750
April 2000	Health	Anny Wassef	35,470,900
May 2000	Natural Legacy	Randy Trantau	36,236,900
June 2000	Harmony	Haver Demirer	35,184,200
July 2000	Celebration	Laura Paxton	35,144,100
August 2000	Family	Wade Stephen Baker	35,107,700
September 2000	Wisdom	Cezar Şerbănescu	35,123,950
October 2000	Creativity	Eric (Kong Tat) Hui	35,316,770
November 2000	Freedom	Kathy Vinish	35,188,900
December 2000	Community	Michelle Thibodeau	35,155,400

=== 2005: Alberta and Saskatchewan centennials ===
In 2005, to celebrate the centennials of the provinces of Alberta and Saskatchewan, two commemorative quarters were issued. The public was given the opportunity to vote on the coin design through two toll-free phone numbers.

There were four candidate designs for the Alberta quarter: Big Sky Country, Alberta's Natural Beauty, A Dynamic Century, and Rocky Mountain Bighorn Sheep. The winning design was Big Sky Country, by Michelle Grant, and depicted an oil derrick with cattle grazing at its base. The coin had a mintage of 20,640,000.

There were three candidate designs for the Saskatchewan quarter: The Western Meadowlark, Canada Geese over Wascana Lake, and The Round Dance Celebration. The winning design was Western Meadowlark, designed by Paulette Sapergia. The coin's mintage was 19,290,000.

Date of issue	Province	Artist	Mintage
July 19, 2005	Alberta	Michelle Grant	20,640,000
July 13, 2005	Saskatchewan	Paulette Sapergia	19,290,000

=== 2007–2010: Vancouver Olympics ===
Date of Issue	Sport	Artist	Mintage
February 23, 2007	Curling	Glen Green	22,400,000
April 3, 2007	Ice hockey	Glen Green	22,400,000
July 11, 2007	Wheelchair curling	Glen Green	22,400,000
September 12, 2007	Biathlon	Glen Green	22,400,000
October 24, 2007	Alpine skiing	Glen Green	22,400,000
February 20, 2008	Snowboarding	Glen Green	22,400,000
April 16, 2008	Freestyle skiing	Glen Green	22,400,000
November 18, 2008	Figure skating	Glen Green	22,400,000
2008	Bobsleigh	Glen Green	22,400,000
January 15, 2009	Cross-country skiing	Glen Green	22,400,000
March 12, 2009	Speed skating	Glen Green	22,400,000
2009	Sledge hockey	Glen Green	22,400,000
September 29, 2009	Men's ice hockey	J.B. & RCM engravers	19,000,000
September 29, 2009	Men's ice hockey – colourized (red)	J.B. & RCM engravers	3,000,000
November 17, 2009	Women's ice hockey	J.B. & RCM engravers	19,000,000
November 17, 2009	Women's ice hockey – colourized (red)	J.B. & RCM engravers	3,000,000
January 5, 2010	Cindy Klassen	Jason Bouwman	19,000,000
January 5, 2010	Cindy Klassen – colourized (red)	Jason Bouwman	3,000,000

=== 2011: Legendary Nature ===
Date of issue	Animal	Artist	Mintage
January 2011	Wood bison	Nolin BBDO Montreal	6,250,000
January 2011	Wood bison – colourized (green)	Nolin BBDO Montreal	6,250,000
February 2011	Orca	Nolin BBDO Montreal	6,250,000
February 2011	Orca – colourized (blue)	Nolin BBDO Montreal	6,250,000
March 2011	Peregrine falcon	Nolin BBDO Montreal	6,250,000
March 2011	Peregrine falcon – colourized (yellow)	Nolin BBDO Montreal	6,250,000

=== 2012: War of 1812 bicentennial ===
Date of Issue	Subject	Artist	Mintage
October 13, 2012	Sir Isaac Brock	Bonnie Ross	6,250,000
October 13, 2012	Sir Isaac Brock – colourized (red maple leaf from the War of 1812 logo)	Bonnie Ross	6,250,000
November 19, 2012	Tecumseh	Bonnie Ross	6,250,000
November 19, 2012	Tecumseh – colourized (red maple leaf from the War of 1812 logo)	Bonnie Ross	6,250,000
March 18, 2013	Charles-Michel de Salaberry	Bonnie Ross	6,250,000
March 18, 2013	Charles-Michel de Salaberry – colourized (red maple leaf from the War of 1812 logo)	Bonnie Ross	6,250,000
June 22, 2013	Laura Secord	Bonnie Ross	6,250,000
June 22, 2013	Laura Secord – colourized (red maple leaf from the War of 1812 logo)	Bonnie Ross	6,250,000

== Non-circulating commemoratives ==
=== Individual events (NC) ===
Year	Mintage	Artist	Composition	Reason
1998	25,000	Ago Aarand	92.5% silver, 7.5% copper	90th anniversary of the Royal Canadian Mint (matte finish)
1998	—N/a	Ago Aarand	92.5% silver, 7.5% copper	90th anniversary of the Royal Canadian Mint (mirror finish)
2002	65,315	Ago Aarand	92.5% silver, 7.5% copper	Elizabeth II (Golden Jubilee) (Proof set)
2003	21,537	Mary Gillick	92.5% silver, 7.5% copper	Elizabeth II (Coronation Jubilee) (Proof set)
2004	12,677	Cosme Saffioti, Stan Witten	92.5% silver, 7.5% copper	Remembrance Day
2005	3,500	Susan Taylor	92.5% silver, 7.5% copper	60th Anniversary of the Liberation of the Netherlands (Proof set)
2006	40,911	Cosme Saffioti	92.5% silver, 7.5% copper	Breast Cancer Awareness
2006	8,200	Cecily Mok		Québec Winter Carnival
2006	24,977	Cosme Saffioti	Nickel plated steel	80th Birthday of the Queen (over-sized coin)
2007	15,235	Robert-Ralph Carmichael	Nickel plated steel	60th Anniversary of the Wedding of Queen Elizabeth II (over-sized coin)
2008	32,795	Ben Stahl	Nickel plated steel	100th Anniversary of Anne of Green Gables (over-sized coin)
2008	10,167	David Craig	Nickel plated steel	90th Anniversary of the end of World War I (over-sized coin)
2009	16,653	Motif créé d’après une	Nickel plated steel	Notre-Dame-du-Saguenay statue
2010	5,000	W.H.J. Blakemore	92.5% silver, 7.5% copper	75th anniversary of Canada's Voyageur Silver Dollar (Proof set)
2011	6,000	—N/a	92.5% silver, 7.5% copper	100th anniversary of the 1911 Silver Dollar (Proof set)
2011	7,777	Konrad Wachelko	75% copper, 25% nickel	75th Anniversary of the Canadian Broadcasting Corporation
2011	59,585	José Osio	Nickel plated steel	Wedding of William, Prince of Wales and Catherine Middleton
2012	34,309	Yves Bérubé	75% copper, 25% nickel	100th Anniversary of Titanic
2012	11,950	Yves Bérubé	75% copper, 25% nickel	50th Anniversary of the Canadian coast guard
2013	15,000	Phil Richards	75% copper, 25% nickel	Elizabeth II (Diamond Jubilee)
2013	15,003	Laurie McGaw	Nickel plated steel	Birth of Prince George of Wales
2017	20,000	Alex Colville	99.9% silver	150th anniversary of the Confederation of Canada (Centennial Bobcat; 2017 version) (Proof set)
2017	20,000	Joelle Wong	99.9% silver	150th anniversary: "Our home and native land"
2017	5,500	Emanuel Otto Hahn & J. E. H. MacDonald	99.9% silver	150th anniversary: "The forgotten 1927 Designs" (Proof set)
2019	30,000	Tony Bianco	Nickel plated steel	100th Anniversary of the Canadian National Railway
2019	15,000	Tony Bianco	Trimetallic (Note: Copper-nickel middle ring and bronze outer ring bonded to a brass core.)	35th anniversary: First Canadian in Space

=== Canada Day ===
From 2000 to 2009, the RCM issued colourized quarters on Canada Day with designs aimed to attract young collectors. As with other collector coins issued by the RCM, the Canada Day series coins are non-circulating legal tender. These quarters were struck in both nickel plated steel and sterling silver. A variant of the 2002 Canada Day coin was issued in circulation without any colour. It was presented to new Canadians at their citizenship ceremony during "Celebrate Canada Day" week. These coins were distributed between July and September 2002 with a final mintage of 30,627,000.

Year	Mintage	Artist	Design (reverse)
2000	26,106	Laura Paxton	Millennium coloured coin "Canada Day"
2001	96,352	Silke Ware	Red maple leaf and children holding hands below
2002	49,901	Stan Witten	Large red coloured maple leaf
2003	63,511	Jade Pearen	Polar bear with red coloured maple leaves
2004	44,752	Nick Wooster	Stylized moose head with the sun, moon, and stars
2004	16,028	Cosme Saffioti	Small red coloured maple leaf
2005	58,370	Stan Witten	Coloured beaver with a red maple leaf on is belly
2006	30,328	Stan Witten	Two kids waving the Canadian flag with fireworks
2007	27,743	José Osio	Colourized portrait of an RCMP officer.
2008	11,538	Stan Witten	Colourized moose with sunglasses, a shirt and a backwards cap.
2009	11,091	RCM Engravers	A schooner carrying a polar bear (with flag), a beaver, a caribou and a loon

=== Themes ===
==== Holiday coin sets ====
From 2004 to 2013, the Royal Canadian Mint released commemorative holiday coins, these were all struck in nickel plated steel.

Year	Mintage	Design (reverse)
2004	62,777	Santa Claus
2005	72,831	Teddy bear in a Christmas stocking
2006	99,258	Santa Claus and Rudolph the Red-Nosed Reindeer
2007	66,267	Christmas tree
2008	42,344	Santa Claus
2009	Unknown	Santa Claus
2010	Unknown	Santa Claus
2011	Unknown	Snowflake
2012	Unknown	Peace and Joy
2013	Unknown	Christmas wreath

==== Animals ====
Year	Mintage	Artist	Animal	Series
2007	20,000	Arnold Nogy	Ruby-throated hummingbird	Birds of Canada
2007	67,672	Arnold Nogy	Red-breasted nuthatch	Birds of Canada
2008	25,000	Arnold Nogy	Downy woodpecker	Birds of Canada
2008	25,000	Arnold Nogy	Northern cardinal	Birds of Canada
2010	14,000	Arnold Nogy	American goldfinch	Birds of Canada
2010	14,000	Arnold Nogy	Blue jay	Birds of Canada
2011	14,000	Arnold Nogy	Barn swallow	Birds of Canada
2011	14,000	Arnold Nogy	Black-capped chickadee	Birds of Canada
2012	20,000	Arnold Nogy	Evening grosbeak	Birds of Canada
2012	20,000	Arnold Nogy	Rose-breasted grosbeak	Birds of Canada
2012	25,000	Julius T. Csotonyi	Pachyrhinosaurus lakustai	Prehistoric Creatures
2012	30,000	Julius T. Csotonyi	Quetzalcoatlus	Prehistoric Creatures
2013	17,500	Trevor Tennant	American robin	Birds of Canada
2013	17,500	Trevor Tennant	Barn owl	Birds of Canada
2013	17,500	Trevor Tennant	Mallard	Ducks of Canada
2013	17,500	Trevor Tennant	Wood duck	Ducks of Canada
2013	30,000	Julius T. Csotonyi	Tylosaurus Pembinensis	Prehistoric Creatures
2014	17,500	Tony Bianco	Eastern meadowlark	Birds of Canada
2014	17,500	Pierre Leduc	Scarlet tanager	Birds of Canada
2014	17,500	Trevor Tennant	Northern pintail	Ducks of Canada
2014	17,500	Trevor Tennant	Harlequin Duck	Ducks of Canada
2014	30,000	Julius T. Csotonyi	Tiktaalik	Prehistoric Creatures
2015	17,500	Denis Mayer Jr.	Cinnamon teal	Ducks of Canada
2017	25,000	—N/a	Domestic dog	Love my animal
2017	25,000	—N/a	Domestic cat	Love my animal
2019	100,000	Julius T. Csotonyi	Albertosaurus	Dinosaurs of Canada (set)
2019	100,000	Julius T. Csotonyi	Edmontonia	Dinosaurs of Canada (set)
2019	100,000	Julius T. Csotonyi	Pachyrhinosaurus	Dinosaurs of Canada (set)
2020	50,000	Tony Bianco	Atlantic puffin	Connecting Canada (set)
2020	50,000	Tony Bianco	Kermode Bear	Connecting Canada (set)
2020	50,000	Tony Bianco	Narwhal	Connecting Canada (set)

==== Fiction and Mystery ====
Year	Mintage	Artist	Design (reverse)	Series
2011	Unknown	RCM Engravers	Tooth fairy in flight	Tooth Fairy
2011	Unknown	Emily S. Damstra	Memphre	Mysterious creatures
2011	Unknown	Emily S. Damstra	Sasquatch	Mysterious creatures
2011	Unknown	Emily S. Damstra	Mishepishu	Mysterious creatures
2012	Unknown	Gary Taxali	Tooth fairy in flight	Tooth Fairy
2014	15,000	—N/a	Ghost Bride	Haunted Canada
2015	15,000	—N/a	The Brakeman	Haunted Canada
2016	20,000	—N/a	Bell Island	Haunted Canada
2016	30,000	DC Comics	Batman and Superman	Dawn of Justice
2016	Unknown	—N/a	Starship Enterprise	Star Trek
2018	Unknown	DC Comics	Superheros	Justice League
2019	25,000	—N/a	3D image of Optimus Prime	Optimus Prime

==== Flora and Fauna series ====
Year	Mintage	Artist	Theme
2011	20,000	Cosme Saffioti	Tulip with Ladybug
2012	20,000	Maurice Gervais	Aster with Bumble Bee
2013	17,500	Maurice Gervais	Purple Coneflower and Eastern Tailed Blue Butterfly
2013	7,189	Claudio D'Angelo	Prickly Pear Cactus
2014	17,500	Maurice Gervais	Water-lily and Leopard Frog

=== Gift sets ===
Year	Mintage	Artist	Design (reverse)	Gift set
2007	24,531	—N/a	Rattle	Baby
2007	13,423	—N/a	Balloons	Birthday
2007	8,910	Emanuel Otto Hahn	Fireworks	Congratulations
2007	23,582	—N/a	Large red maple leaf	Oh! Canada
2007	10,318	—N/a	Flowers	Wedding
2008	29,819	—N/a	Teddy bear	Baby
2008	11,376	Emanuel Otto Hahn	Birthday Hat	Birthday
2008	6,821	Emanuel Otto Hahn	Trophy	Congratulations
2008	30,567	—N/a	Canadian Flag	Oh! Canada
2008	7,404	—N/a	Wedding Cake	Wedding
2009	25,182	—N/a	Teddy bear with blue and pink pillows	Baby
2009	9,663	—N/a	Colored balloons	Birthday
2009	4,126	—N/a	Colored fireworks with maple leaves	Congratulations
2009	14,451	—N/a	Orange Maple Leaves	Oh! Canada
2009	—N/a	—N/a	Blue colored flower	Thank You
2009	7,571	Emanuel Otto Hahn	Two pink birds	Wedding
2010	27,048	—N/a	Blue baby carriage	Baby
2010	8,751	—N/a	Pink birthday gift with yellow ribbon	Birthday
2010	—N/a	—N/a	Colorized star shaped fireworks	Congratulations
2010	19,769	—N/a	Colorized maple leaves	Oh! Canada
2010	—N/a	—N/a	Three colorized zinnias	Thank You
2010	8,194	—N/a	Pink hearts and roses	Wedding
2011	38,576	—N/a	Baby feet	Baby
2011	21,173	—N/a	Birthday balloons with "2011" on them	Birthday
2011	22,475	—N/a	National anthem of Canada	Oh! Canada
2011	20,461	—N/a	Two wedding rings	Wedding
2012	43,920	Gary Taxali	Baby mobile	Baby
2012	24,659	—N/a	Cupcake holding onto 3 balloons	Birthday
2012	31,464	Emanuel Otto Hahn	Maple leaves with faces	Oh! Canada
2012	24,325	Emanuel Otto Hahn	Two wedding rings	Wedding
2013	53,708	Martin Coté	Baby feet	Baby
2013	22,678	Emanuel Hahn	Birthday cake slice	Birthday
2013	26,068	Martin Coté	Maple leaf	Oh! Canada
2013	20,317	Matthew Bowen	Two wedding rings	Wedding

== Controversy ==
In 2004, a quarter was issued in honour of Remembrance Day, featuring a corn poppy on the reverse, a traditional symbol in Canada of that day. This resulted in an international incident in which American military contractors unfamiliar with the coin's design believed these coins were outfitted with nanotechnology designed for espionage.

== See also ==
- Commemorative banknotes of the Canadian dollar
- Royal Canadian Mint tokens and medallions
- Newfoundland twenty-five cents
