= Royal Canadian Mint ice hockey coins =

The Royal Canadian Mint has made coins with various themes. Most recently, ice hockey has been used for many numismatic releases. The first known ice hockey coin was for the 1988 Winter Olympics. Issued on February 25, 1986, the coin featured a goalie on the coin. Edge lettering was also used for the coin, the first time that it was used on silver coins.

In the 1990s, the theme would be used more frequently. The first issue was in 1991 and was on a coin with a denomination of $200. The coin was titled A National Passion and it was issued as a tribute to the spirit and vitality of Canadian youth and the national game of hockey. The most noticeable example was for two of the Silver Dollar series. The Silver Dollar for 1993 and 1997 would feature hockey as its theme.

Logos from the Canadian National Hockey League franchises would start to appear on Canadian coinage. This would start in 2005 as part of various gift sets. The sets were similar to the O Canada set in terms of packaging, but the one difference is that the twenty-five cent coin had a team logo in colour. The first sets were issued for the 2005-2006 NHL regular season and the sets were issued for the Montreal Canadiens, Ottawa Senators, and the Toronto Maple Leafs. The following season, offerings included all six Canadian franchises. The sets would feature "vintage" logos, including the Vancouver Canucks first logo (which featured a stick and a puck) and the Senators logo from the 1920s.

== Fifty Cents ==
=== Canadian Sports Series ===
Year	Description	Artist	Finish	Issue price (was part of four coin set)	Total mintage
2000	First recorded ice hockey game, 1875	Brian Hughes	Proof	$59.95	50,091

== Olympics ==
To commemorate the 1988 Winter Olympics, held in Calgary, Alberta, Canada, the Royal Canadian Mint issued five series of Olympic coins. Each series had two coins and the coin honouring hockey was featured in Series Two.

The coins were issued to help with the financing of the event. Edge lettering was used for the first time on Canadian coins. “XV OLYMPIC WINTER GAMES – JEUX OLYMPIQUES D’HIVER” appeared on all ten silver coins. There are existing varieties that have missed the edge lettering process.

=== Calgary Games ===
Year	Series	Sport	Artist	Mintage	Issue price
1986	Second Series	Hockey	Ian Stewart	396,602	$37.00

=== Vancouver Games ===
==== Circulation ====
- All circulation coins had a face value of twenty five cents

Year	Sport	Artist	Mintage	Image
2007	Ice Hockey	Glen Green	22,000,000	
2009	Ice Sledge hockey	Glen Green	22,000,000	
2009	Olympic Moment #1: 2002 Men's Hockey Team	Jason Bouwman	29,000,000	
2009	Olympic Moment #2: 2002 Women's Hockey Team	Jason Bouwman	29,000,000	

==== Sterling Silver ====
Year	Sport	Artist	Mintage	Issue price	Release date
2007	Ice Hockey	Steve Hepburn	45,000	$69.95	April 4

Specifications

Composition	Finish	Weight (grams)	Diameter (mm)	Special notes
92.5% silver, 7.5% copper	Proof (with hologram on reverse)	27.78	40	First ever holographic coin collection for the Olympic Winter Games

==== Mascot Sport Poses ====
Each Mascot sport pose coin features each of the Vancouver 2010 Olympic and Paralympic mascots: Miga, Quatchi and Sumi. But no coin features Mukmuk, a "sidekick" of these mascots. All coins had a face value of 50 cents, were packaged in a plastic sleeve, and the issue price was $9.95.

Mascot	Sport Pose
Miga	Ice Hockey
Quatchi	Ice Hockey
Sumi	Paralympic Ice sledge Hockey

== NHL coins ==
=== Twenty-Five Cents ===
Year	Theme	Artist	Mintage	Issue price	Special notes
2006	Montreal Canadiens	N/A	N/A	24.95	From Montreal Canadiens Gift Set
2006	Ottawa Senators	N/A	N/A	24.95	From Ottawa Senators Gift Set
2006	Toronto Maple Leafs	N/A	N/A	24.95	From Toronto Maple Leafs Gift Set
2007	Calgary Flames	N/A	832	24.95	From Calgary Flames Gift Set
2007	Edmonton Oilers	N/A	2213	24.95	From Edmonton Oilers Gift Set
2007	Montreal Canadiens	N/A	2952	24.95	From Montreal Canadiens Gift Set
2007	Ottawa Senators	N/A	1634	24.95	From Ottawa Senators Gift Set
2007	Toronto Maple Leafs	N/A	3527	24.95	From Toronto Maple Leafs Gift Set
2007	Vancouver Canucks	N/A	1264	24.95	From Vancouver Canucks Gift Set

=== Fifty Cents ===
Year	Team	Legends	Mintage	Issue Price	Finish
2005	Montreal Canadiens	Jean Béliveau, Guy Lafleur, Jacques Plante, Maurice Richard	25,000	$99.95	Specimen
2005	Toronto Maple Leafs	Johnny Bower, Tim Horton, Dave Keon, Darryl Sittler	25,000	$99.95	Specimen

- NOTE: All legends sets consisted of four coins with images provided courtesy of the Hockey Hall of Fame

Year	Theme	Mintage	Issue price
2010	Calgary Flames	N/A	14.95
2010	Edmonton Oilers	N/A	14.95
2010	Montreal Canadiens	N/A	14.95
2010	Ottawa Senators	N/A	14.95
2010	Toronto Maple Leafs	N/A	14.95
2010	Vancouver Canucks	N/A	14.95

- NOTE: All coins featured a partial image of an athlete of the respective team on the coin.

=== One Dollar ===
Year	Theme	Artist	Mintage	Issue price	Special notes
2008	Calgary Flames	N/A	N/A	15.95	From Coin and Puck Set
2008	Calgary Flames	N/A	N/A	24.95	From Calgary Flames Gift Set
2008	Edmonton Oilers	N/A	N/A	15.95	From Coin and Puck Set
2008	Edmonton Oilers	N/A	N/A	24.95	From Edmonton Oilers Gift Set
2008	Montreal Canadiens	N/A	N/A	15.95	From Coin and Puck Set
2008	Montreal Canadiens	N/A	N/A	24.95	From Montreal Canadiens Gift Set
2008	Ottawa Senators	N/A	N/A	15.95	From Coin and Puck Set
2008	Ottawa Senators	N/A	N/A	24.95	From Ottawa Senators Gift Set
2008	Toronto Maple Leafs	N/A	N/A	15.95	From Coin and Puck Set
2008	Toronto Maple Leafs	N/A	N/A	24.95	From Toronto Maple Leafs Gift Set
2008	Vancouver Canucks	N/A	N/A	15.95	From Coin and Puck Set
2008	Vancouver Canucks	N/A	N/A	24.95	From Vancouver Canucks Gift Set
2009	Calgary Flames	N/A	N/A	24.95	From Calgary Flames Gift Set
2009	Edmonton Oilers	N/A	N/A	24.95	From Edmonton Oilers Gift Set
2009	Montreal Canadiens	N/A	N/A	24.95	From Montreal Canadiens Gift Set
2009	Ottawa Senators	N/A	N/A	24.95	From Ottawa Senators Gift Set
2009	Toronto Maple Leafs	N/A	N/A	24.95	From Toronto Maple Leafs Gift Set
2009	Vancouver Canucks	N/A	N/A	24.95	From Vancouver Canucks Gift Set

=== NHL Goalie Mask Coins ===
In October 2008, the RCM issued six sterling silver coins with a $20 Face Value. Each coin had the goalie mask of one of the six Canadian hockey teams. In the case of the Toronto Maple Leafs and Montreal Canadiens Goalie Mask coins, it is believed that the surviving mintage is less than 50.

Year	Face Value	Teams	Artist	Mintage	Composition	Issue Price	Special Notes
2008	Twenty dollars	Calgary Flames, Edmonton Oilers, Ottawa Senators, Montreal Canadiens, Toronto Maple Leafs, Vancouver Canucks	Marcos Hallam	under 200 coins per team	92.5% silver, 7.5% copper	74.95 each	Includes special lucite stand

=== Montreal Canadiens 100th Anniversary ===
Canadiens executive Ray Lalonde confirmed that in March 2009, more than 10 million copies of the Canadian one dollar coin will adorn the legendary Montreal Canadiens logo. On an additional note, Canada Post will also issue four million stamps honouring the Canadiens anniversary.

- Four unique gold coins were produced by the RCM to honour the 100th anniversary of the Montreal Canadiens. The coins are on permanent display at the Centennial Plaza at the Bell Centre in Montreal. The coins have a face value of $1 and have the Canadiens centennial logo on the reverse. The coins are featured on memorial plaques dedicated to four legends: Howie Morenz, Maurice Richard, Jean Beliveau, and Guy Lafleur. The obverse is the Susanna Blunt effigy of Her Majesty Queen Elizabeth II. Each plaque also has two circulation five cent coins marking the start and end of each player's career. The coins were gold-plated versions of the nickel aureate dollar used for circulating $1 coins.
- A special edition proof silver dollar was also issued with two different types of packaging.

Year	Theme	Artist	Mintage	Issue Price (with acrylic stand)	Issue Price (with standard packaging)
2009	Montreal Canadiens centennial	Royal Canadian Mint engravers	15,000	$74.95	$69.95

- Starting in the autumn of 2008, the Royal Canadian Mint created six fifty cent coins embedded in a plastic sports card. The coins were double dated 1908 and 2008 to commemorate the Canadiens centennial. All the coins were distributed through the Jean Coutu Pharmacy chain in Quebec. All coins had a retail price of $9.95 each.

Release date	Year of Logo
October 1, 2008	2008-09
November 15, 2008	1945-46
December 4, 2009	1915-16
February 1, 2009	1912-13
March 15, 2009	1910-11
April 1, 2009	1909-10

== Silver Dollar ==
Two key moments in Hockey history have been commemorated on Canada's silver dollar series. The first of these coins was the Centennial of the Stanley Cup. The Cup was first presented in 1893 to the Montreal Amateur Athletic Association team by Lord Stanley. The RCM issued the coin in 1993, and the proof coin was in a black leatherette case, with a maroon insert and a Certificate of Authenticity. The Brilliant Uncirculated version was in a clear plastic outer case, with a black plastic insert and a silver sleeve.

To commemorate the 25th anniversary of Paul Henderson's series clinching goal against Russia, the RCM placed Henderson on its Silver Dollar for 1997. The RCM offered two gift packages: a sterling silver pin and Uncirculated dollar, and a numbered colour reproduction print and an Uncirculated Dollar.

Year	Theme	Artist	Mintage (proof)	Issue price (proof)	Mintage (BU)	Issue price (BU)
1993	Stanley Cup Centennial	Stewart Sherwood	294,214	$23.95	88,150	$17.50
1997	25th Anniversary of Canada/Russia Summit Series	Walter Burden	184,965	$29.95	155,252	$19.95

== 100 Dollar Gold ==
Year	Theme	Artist	Mintage	Issue price
2006	75th Anniversary, Longest International Hockey Series - Royal Military College of Canada vs United States Military Academy hockey classic	Tony Bianco	9,000	$329.95

== 200 Dollar Gold ==
Year	Theme	Artist	Mintage	Issue price
1991	A National Passion (Hockey)	Stewart Sherwood	10,215	$425.00

== Medallions ==
Starting in 1997, the Royal Canadian Mint started to sell hockey medallions to the public. To commemorate the induction of Mario Lemieux in the Hockey Hall of Fame, a set was issued honouring all three inductees. One set was issued in Sterling Silver while another was issued in Nickel. The success of the release led to future issues.

As a way of commemorating the retirement of Wayne Gretzky, a medallion was issued with a mintage of over 50,000. The medallions were $9.95 each and they were packaged in a blue sleeve with the number 99 in red on the packaging.

=== Canada Post ===
Starting in 2000, a series of stamps was issued to commemorate the All-Star Game in Toronto. The success of the series led to future stamp releases. Starting in 2001, the stamps were issued in a special collectors set. The stamps were packaged in a hard plastic case, with a hockey puck and corresponding medallions. These medallions were struck by the Royal Canadian Mint.

Year of issue	Theme	Players	Issue price
2001	NHL All-Stars	Jean Béliveau, Eddie Shore, Terry Sawchuk, Denis Potvin, Bobby Hull, Syl Apps	N/A
2002	NHL All-Stars	Tim Horton, Guy Lafleur, Howie Morenz, Glenn Hall, Red Kelly, Phil Esposito	N/A
2003	NHL All-Stars	Frank Mahovlich, Ray Bourque, Serge Savard, Stan Mikita, Mike Bossy, Bill Durnan	N/A
2004	NHL All-Stars	Larry Robinson, Marcel Dionne, Ted Lindsay, Johnny Bower, Brad Park, Milt Schmidt	N/A
2005	NHL All-Stars	Henri Richard, Grant Fuhr, Allan Stanley, Pierre Pilote, Bryan Trottier, Johnny Bucyk	N/A

=== Hockey Hall of Fame ===
Year of issue	Theme	Description	Composition	Issue price	Mintage
1997	Hockey Hall of Fame Inductees Medallion Collection	Mario Lemieux, Glen Sather, Bryan Trottier	Sterling Silver	$69.99	1,997
1997	Hockey Hall of Fame Inductees Medallion Collection	Mario Lemieux, Glen Sather, Bryan Trottier	Nickel	$19.95	N/A
1998	Hockey Hall of Fame Inductees Medallion Collection	Michel Goulet, Peter Stastny, Roy Conacher, Monsignor Athol Murray	Sterling Silver	$89.99	1,998
1998	Hockey Hall of Fame Inductees Medallion Collection	Michel Goulet, Peter Stastny, Roy Conacher, Monsignor Athol Murray	Nickel	$29.00 (set), $7.50 (individually)	N/A
1999	Hockey Hall of Fame Inductees Medallion Collection	Wayne Gretzky, Ian “Scotty” Morrison, Andy Van Hellemond	Sterling Silver	$99.00	1,999
2001	Hockey Hall of Fame Inductees Medallion Collection	Viacheslav Fetisov, Mike Gartner, Dale Hawerchuk, Jari Kurri, Craig Patrick	Nickel	$29.95	N/A

=== Wayne Gretzky ===
Year of issue	Theme	Description	Finish	Weight	Diameter	Thickness	Issue price	Mintage
1999	Wayne Gretzky Medallion	Composed of Nickel	Proof	13.338	27	2	$9.99	50,000

=== 2009 IIHF World Junior Championships ===
The Royal Canadian Mint has produced the medals for the 2009 IIHF World Junior Hockey Championship. This event will take place in Ottawa from December 26, 2008, to January 5, 2009. For the IIHF World Junior Hockey Championship medals, which were designed in collaboration with the IIHF and Hockey Canada, the Mint cut each blank – which is a medal without a design – out of copper. After the distinctive Ottawa design was struck onto each blank twice on a manual press using several tons of pressure, the medals were given their distinguishing finish: the coveted championship medals are plated with 24kt gold while the second-place medals are silver-plated and the third-place medals are finished with a warm bronze tone. All medals are lacquered and bear a Maple Leaf which is coloured with red enamel.

The Mint also sourced the tournament's popular Player of the Game award, which this year is a uniquely Canadian-made acrylic and aluminum Hoselton sculpture, housed in a cherry wood box.
