= Royal Canadian Mint tokens and medallions =

Starting in 1997, the Royal Canadian Mint started to sell hockey medallions to the public. To commemorate the induction of Mario Lemieux in the Hockey Hall of Fame, a set was issued honouring all three inductees. One set was issued in Sterling Silver while another was issued in Nickel. The success of the release led to future issues.

As a way of commemorating the retirement of Wayne Gretzky, a medallion was issued with a mintage of over 50,000. The medallions were $9.95 each and they were packaged in a blue sleeve with the number 99 in red on the packaging.

== Hockey medallions ==
=== Canada Post ===
Starting in 2000, a series of stamps was issued to commemorate the All-Star Game in Toronto. The success of the series led to future stamp releases. Starting in 2001, the stamps were issued in a special collectors set. The stamps were packaged in a hard plastic case, with a hockey puck and corresponding medallions. These medallions were struck by the Royal Canadian Mint.

| Year of issue | Theme | Players | Issue price |
|---|---|---|---|
| 2001 | NHL All-Stars | Jean Béliveau, Eddie Shore, Terry Sawchuk, Denis Potvin, Bobby Hull, Syl Apps | N/A |
| 2002 | NHL All-Stars | Tim Horton, Guy Lafleur, Howie Morenz, Glenn Hall, Red Kelly, Phil Esposito | N/A |
| 2003 | NHL All-Stars | Frank Mahovlich, Ray Bourque, Serge Savard, Stan Mikita, Mike Bossy, Bill Durnan | N/A |
| 2004 | NHL All-Stars | Larry Robinson, Marcel Dionne, Ted Lindsay, Johnny Bower, Brad Park, Milt Schmidt | N/A |
| 2005 | NHL All-Stars | Henri Richard, Grant Fuhr, Allan Stanley, Pierre Pilote, Bryan Trottier, Johnny Bucyk | N/A |

=== Hockey Hall of Fame ===
| Year of issue | Theme | Description | Composition | Issue price | Mintage |
|---|---|---|---|---|---|
| 1997 | Hockey Hall of Fame Inductees Medallion Collection | Mario Lemieux, Glen Sather, Bryan Trottier | Sterling Silver | $69.99 | 1,997 |
| 1997 | Hockey Hall of Fame Inductees Medallion Collection | Mario Lemieux, Glen Sather, Bryan Trottier | Nickel | $19.95 | N/A |
| 1998 | Hockey Hall of Fame Inductees Medallion Collection | Michel Goulet, Peter Stastny, Roy Conacher, Monsignor Athol Murray | Sterling Silver | $89.99 | 1,998 |
| 1998 | Hockey Hall of Fame Inductees Medallion Collection | Michel Goulet, Peter Stastny, Roy Conacher, Monsignor Athol Murray | Nickel | $29.00 (set), $7.50 (individually) | N/A |
| 1999 | Hockey Hall of Fame Inductees Medallion Collection | Wayne Gretzky, Ian “Scotty” Morrison, Andy Van Hellemond | Sterling Silver | $99.00 | 1,999 |
| 2001 | Hockey Hall of Fame Inductees Medallion Collection | Viacheslav Fetisov, Mike Gartner, Dale Hawerchuk, Jari Kurri, Craig Patrick | Nickel | $29.95 | N/A |

=== Wayne Gretzky ===
| Year of issue | Theme | Description | Finish | Weight | Diameter | Thickness | Issue price | Mintage |
|---|---|---|---|---|---|---|---|---|
| 1999 | Wayne Gretzky Medallion | Composed of Nickel | Proof | 13.338 | 27 | 2 | $9.99 | 50,000 |

=== 2009 IIHF World Junior Championships ===
The Royal Canadian Mint has produced the medals for the 2009 IIHF World Junior Hockey Championship. This event will take place in Ottawa from December 26, 2008, to January 5, 2009. For the IIHF World Junior Hockey Championship medals, which were designed in collaboration with the IIHF and Hockey Canada, the Mint cut each blank – which is a medal without a design – out of copper. After the distinctive Ottawa design was struck onto each blank twice on a manual press using several tons of pressure, the medals were given their distinguishing finish: the coveted championship medals are plated with 24kt gold while the second-place medals are silver-plated and the third-place medals are finished with a warm bronze tone. All medals are lacquered and bear a Maple Leaf which is coloured with red enamel.

The Mint also sourced the tournament's popular Player of the Game award, which this year is a uniquely Canadian-made acrylic and aluminum Hoselton sculpture, housed in a cherry wood box.

== Test tokens ==
=== One Cent Test Tokens ===
| Year of Issue | Description | Weight | Diameter | Thickness | Edge |
|---|---|---|---|---|---|
| 1976 | Round Copper Token, Three Maple Leaves with Beads | 3.24 grams | 19.05 mm | 1.42 mm | Plain |
| 1977 | Round Copper Token | 1.87 grams | 16.0 mm | 1.35 mm | Plain |
| 1979 | Round Copper Token, Three Maple Leaves with Beads | 2.80 grams | 19.05 mm | 1.38 mm | Plain |
| 1979 | Round Copper-Zinc Token, Three Maple Leaves with Beads | 2.70 grams | 19.20 mm | 1.30 mm | Plain |
| 1980 | Seven Sided Copper Token, Three Maple Leaves with Beads | 2.3 grams | 18.7 mm | 1.3 mm | Plain |
| 1981 | Eleven Sided Copper Token, Three Maple Leaves with Beads | 2.6 grams | 18.95 mm | 1.5 mm | Plain |
| 1981 | Twelve Sided Copper Token, Three Maple Leaves with Beads | 2.5 grams | 19.10 mm | 1.45 mm | Plain |

=== Five Cent Test Tokens ===
| Year of Issue | Description | Weight | Diameter | Thickness | Edge |
|---|---|---|---|---|---|
| 1976 | Round Nickel Token, Three Maple Leaves with Beads | 4.30 grams | 21.9 mm | 1.71 mm | Plain |
| 1983 | Round Stainless Steel Token | 3.50 grams | 21.1 mm | 1.7 mm | Plain |
| 1983 | Nickel Bonded Steel Token | 4.09 grams | 21.2 mm | 1.7 mm | Plain |
| 1983 | Steel Token | 4.00 grams | 21.1 mm | 1.8 mm | Plain |
| 1983 | Nickel Token | 4.07 grams | 21.1 mm | 1.8 mm | Plain |

=== Ten Cent Test Tokens ===
| Year of Issue | Description | Weight | Diameter | Thickness | Edge |
|---|---|---|---|---|---|
| 1965 | Round Nickel Token, Bouquet of Flowers and Fleur de Lis | 2.09 grams | 17.8 mm | 1.2 mm | Reeded |
| 1976 | Round Nickel Token, Three Maple Leaves | 1.75 grams | 17.95 mm | 1.2 mm | Reeded |
| 1983 | Stainless Steel Token, Three Maple Leaves | 1.92 grams | 17.9 mm | 1.0 mm | Reeded |
| 1983 | Nickel Bonded Steel Token, Three Maple Leaves | 1.78 grams | 17.9 mm | 1.0 mm | Reeded |
| 1983 | Steel Token, Three Maple Leaves | 2.00 grams | 17.9 mm | 1.0 mm | Reeded |

=== Test token set 2004 ===
In 2004, the Royal Canadian Mint produced a test token set as a way to commemorate Canada's first 25 cent coloured coin. The token set contains one twenty-five cent coin, and six test tokens. The tokens for the one cent to the twenty five cents are multi-ply plated while the token for the one and two dollar coins are composed of nickel. The finish is brilliant relief on a brilliant background.

| Token | Composition |
|---|---|
| One cent | Multi-ply plated, two-ply |
| Five cents | Multi-ply plated |
| Ten cents | Multi-ply plated |
| Twenty-five cents | Multi-ply plated, RCM logo/poppy reverse |
| One dollar | Nickel-plated bronze |
| Two dollars | Nickel ring, copper/aluminum/nickel ring |

=== Test token set 2006 ===
In 2006, the Royal Canadian Mint produced a test token set as a way to commemorate Canada's second 25 cent coloured coin. The token set contains one twenty-five cent coin, and six test tokens. The tokens for the one cent to the twenty five cents are multi-ply plated while the token for the one and two dollar coins are composed of nickel.

| Token | Composition |
|---|---|
| One cent | Multi-ply plated, two-ply |
| Five cents | Multi-ply plated |
| Ten cents | Multi-ply plated |
| Twenty-five cents | Multi-ply plated, RCM logo/breast cancer reverse |
| One dollar | Nickel-plated bronze |
| Two dollars | Nickel ring, copper/aluminum/nickel ring |

== C.N.A. / R.C.N.A. medallions ==
=== 1983 CNA annual convention ===
The 30th Canadian Numismatic Association annual convention was held in Moncton, New Brunswick, from July 20 to July 23, 1983.

The obverse of the Convention Medal shows the #66 locomotive, a 4-4-0 Type D-17. The reverse shows the early seal of British Columbia at the left and the arms of British Columbia at the right. The design for the reverse was based on the Voyageur dollar. The obverse was designed by Lloyd R. Carson, a retired CNR mechanical supervisor. These were the first medallions struck by the Royal Canadian Mint.

| Specifications | Medal | Special Edition Medal |
|---|---|---|
| Charlton Catalogue # | CNA-30 | CNA-30A |
| Composition | Bronze | Silver |
| Finish | Bright | Bright |
| Weight | 31.3 grams | 30.8 grams |
| Shape | Circular | Circular |
| Diameter | 39.0 mm | 39.0 mm |
| Die axis | Upright | Upright |
| Edge | Plain | Plain |
| Issue price | $10.00 | $35.00 |
| Mintage | 200 | 100 |

=== 1984 CNA annual convention ===
The 31st Canadian Numismatic Association annual convention was held in Hamilton, Ontario, from July 19 to July 22, 1984.

The obverse of the Convention Medal has a theme for the United Empire Loyalists. The artists rendition was taken from a statue erected by the City of Hamilton as a tribute to the settlers that came and made a very positive impact in the surrounding area.

| Specifications | Medal | Special Edition Medal |
|---|---|---|
| Charlton Catalogue # | CNA-31 | CNA-31A |
| Composition | Bronze | Silver |
| Finish | Bright | Reverse Frosted |
| Weight | 31.2 grams | 30.0 grams |
| Shape | Circular | Circular |
| Diameter | 38.9 mm | 38.9 mm |
| Die axis | Upright | Upright |
| Edge | Plain | Plain |
| Issue price | $10.00 | $35.00 |
| Mintage | 250 | 93 |

=== 1985 CNA annual convention ===
The 32nd Canadian Numismatic Association annual convention was held in Regina, Saskatchewan, from July 17 to July 21, 1985.

The theme for the obverse was the “Northcote at Batoche 9 May 1885.” The design features naval action, which was part of the Northwest Rebellion led by Louis Riel.

| Specifications | Medal | Special Edition Medal |
|---|---|---|
| Charlton Catalogue # | CNA-32 | CNA-32A |
| Composition | Bronze | Silver |
| Finish | Bright | Reverse Frosted |
| Weight | 31.3 grams | 31.2 grams |
| Shape | Circular | Circular |
| Diameter | 38.9 mm | 38.9 mm |
| Die axis | Upright | Upright |
| Edge | Plain | Plain |
| Issue price | $10.00 | $35.00 |
| Mintage | 375 | 175 |

=== 1987 CNA annual convention ===
The 34th Canadian Numismatic Association annual convention was held in Calgary, Alberta, from July 14 to July 19, 1987.

The theme for the reverse was a grain elevator, an oil derrick, the Rocky Mountains, and the Calgary Tower.

| Specifications | Medal | Special Edition Medal |
|---|---|---|
| Charlton Catalogue # | CNA-34 | CNA-34A |
| Composition | Bronze | Silver |
| Finish | Bright | Reverse Frosted |
| Weight | 31.5 grams | 31.1 grams |
| Shape | Circular | Circular |
| Diameter | 38.9 mm | 38.9 mm |
| Die axis | Upright | Upright |
| Edge | Plain | Plain |
| Issue price | $12.50 | $35.00 |
| Mintage | 250 | 100 |

=== 1991 CNA annual convention ===
The 38th Canadian Numismatic Association annual convention was held in Toronto, Ontario, from July 23 to July 28, 1985.

The obverse of the Convention Medal featured the skyline of Toronto. At the time, it was the most detailed object ever struck at the Royal Canadian Mint. Every line of its design was drawn by the Royal Canadian Mint's Senior Engraver Stan Witten. It took over a week of painstaking detail to complete the thousands of lines in the 8” diameter sketch.

| Specifications | Medal | Special Edition Medal |
|---|---|---|
| Charlton Catalogue # | CNA-38 | CNA-38A |
| Composition | Bronze | Silver |
| Finish | Bright | Reverse Frosted |
| Weight | N/A | N/A |
| Shape | Circular | Circular |
| Diameter | N/A | N/A |
| Die axis | Upright | Upright |
| Edge | Plain | Plain |
| Issue price | $15.00 | $40.00 |
| Mintage | N/A | N/A |

== Coin and medal sets ==
| Year of issue | Composition | Weight | Dimensions | Thickness | Plain | Finish | Design |
|---|---|---|---|---|---|---|---|
| 2005 | Unlimited | Bronze | 26.40 g | 35.90 mm | Land Sea and Air Imagery Reverse | King George VI Obverse | Part of 2005 End of World War II Coin and Medallion set with special booklet |

=== Quebec 400th anniversary ===
| Year | Composition | Diameter | Obverse | Reverse |
|---|---|---|---|---|
| 2008 | Uncirculated | 35.0 mm | Decorated with the coat of arms of the city of Quebec on one side | Arrival of Champlain's ship at the banks of the St. Lawrence |

== Wafers ==
| Year of issue | Composition | Weight | Dimensions | Thickness | Plain | Finish | Design |
|---|---|---|---|---|---|---|---|
| 2007 | 99.99% silver | 1 oz. | 49.80 mm x 28.60 mm | 2.15 mm | Edge | Proof | Design featured a baby rattle and baby blocks |
| 2007 | 99.99% silver | 1 oz. | 49.80 mm x 28.60 mm | 2.15 mm | Edge | Proof | Design featured a wedding bell and interlocking rings |
| 2007 | 99.99% silver | 1 oz. | 49.80 mm x 28.60 mm | 2.15 mm | Edge | Proof | Design featured the Vancouver 2010 and Paralympic Games logo |

== Vancouver 2010 ==
The Royal Canadian Mint manufactured the medals for the Vancouver 2010 Olympic and Paralympic games. All medals for the 2010 Winter Games were manufactured in the Mint's Ottawa facility. The medals were designed by Corrine Hunt and Omer Arbel. The medals are based on two large master artworks of an orca whale (to be used on the Olympic medals) and raven (to be used on the Paralympic medals). Each of the medals has a unique hand-cropped section of the abstract art, making every medal one-of-a-kind.

- Size: 100 millimetres in diameter and about six mm thick for Olympic medals; 95 mm in width and average of six mm thick for Paralympic medals.
- Weight: Between 500 grams and 576 g depending on the medal. These are the heaviest medals in the history of the Olympic winter games.

The Mint also produced participation medals for athletes and volunteers of the Game.

== Other medallions ==
The Royal Canadian Mint has also been involved in creating medals for various Canadian government agencies. The various medals include the Long Service and Good Conduct for the RCMP, medals for the Department of Veterans’ Affairs and for the Governor General's Performing Arts Awards.

- In 1976, the RCM created the Gold, Silver and bronze medals for the 1976 Olympic Games.
- In 1983, the RCM issued a medallion to commemorate Prince Charles and Lady Diana Spencer. The composition of the medal is 92.5% pure silver and has a diameter of 36mm. The coin had a production limit of 100,000 and its issue price was $24.50.
- In 1986, a medal to commemorate the reopening of the Ottawa Mint facility of the RCM was issued. The composition was copper and the diameter was 60 mm. The engraving was in English and French and a total of 2,000 medals were struck.
- The RCM created a medallion to honour Elvis Presley. The medal features the word Graceland (above an image of the mansion and its gates) and an actual denomination of $10. The reverse of the medal features an engraving of Elvis, along with the words The Man/The Music/The Legend. The medallion itself is undated, but as the medal is 10 ounces, one would assume that it was made for the 10th anniversary of the singer's death. Additional information can be found in the Certificate of Authenticity which states that this Elvis Presley medal was authorized by Legendary Coins and struck by the Royal Canadian Mint. The packaging bears a copyright date of 1987, and states that the medal is for commemorative purposes only and is not legal tender.
- The Royal Canadian Mint was authorized to issue 3 limited edition Eaton coins in .9999 pure silver. The Obverse on all medallions have the effigy of Timothy Eaton The medallions were issued between 1993 and 1995. The medallions were pure silver. The medallions were marketed as a "GiftCoin", and the first coin bore the portrait of Timothy Eaton on the obverse and a likeness of the original store of 1869 on the reverse.
  - The Second in the series depicted the Canada Post Timothy Eaton stamp on the obverse and a likeness of the original store of 1869 on the reverse. The Third medallion in the series depicted Timothy Eaton on the obverse and the World Wildlife Fund logo on the reverse.
  - Each medallion was sold in a plush box and were encapsulated in air-tight mylar plastic. Each medallion was individually numbered on the rim. The weight is 1 ozt (31 g) pure silver (9999) and only 5,000 of each design were minted.

The medallions were marketed as Eaton "GiftCoins". They were inscribed '$50 *REDEEMABLE FOR MERCHANDISE AT EATON*REMBOURSABBLE EN MERCHANDISE CHEZ EATON'.

- In 1994, the RCM released a set of six medallions called the Canada Remembers Medallion Set. It was produced in cooperation with the Canadian Battle of Normandy Foundation and paid tribute to the 50th Anniversary of the end of D-Day. The six medallions included: Passing by Harold Beament, Entry into Assoro, Sicily by Will Ogilvie, D-Day, The Assault, by Orville Fisher, We Flew with the Heroic Flew, by Rich Thistle, The Nijmegen Bridge, Holland by Alex Colville, and Finale by Don Connolly
- In 2008, the RCM released a set of three medallions for the holiday season. The medallions were 5 cm by 5 cm in dimension. All three medallions were plated in 10-karat gold. The medallions were marketed as Ornamental Keepsakes and had ribbons attached to them. The three designs were:
  - A Wintry Sleigh Ride
  - Nanuk of the North
  - Hockey Dreams on Ice
- In 2009, the RCM issued a copper medal of King Edward VIII. It was based on the original design by TH Paget. The medal consisted of a high relief and had a diameter of 36 mm, with a plain edge and an antique finish.
- On December 2, 2009, Canadian Tire announced that their Canadian Tire money would be offered in a coin shape. The piece has a face value of one dollar. The pieces are stamped with the grinning image of Sandy McTire, the company's fictional mascot. The piece was manufactured by the Royal Canadian Mint.

=== Millennium medallions ===
| Year of issue | Theme | Composition | Weight | Diameter |
|---|---|---|---|---|
| 1999 | Millennium Medallion | 1.00 nickel | 5.05 grams | 23.88 mm |
| 1999 | Nestle Canada Medallion | 1.00 nickel | 5.05 grams | 23.88 mm |
| 2000 | Millennium Medallion | 1.00 nickel | 5.05 grams | 23.88 mm |
| 2000 | Nestle Canada Medallion | 1.00 nickel | 5.05 grams | 23.88 mm |

== Military medals ==
The RCM is also known for its production of several military awards. In 1943, the RCM was commissioned to produce the Canada Medal for the Department of National Defense. Currently, it produces the General Campaign Star and ISAF Bar awarded for service in Afghanistan. It also produces the Canadian Forces Decoration and the Memorial Cross.

- On May 16, 2008, the Right Honourable Michaëlle Jean, the Governor General of Canada unveiled the Canadian Victoria Cross. It was produced by the Royal Canadian Mint and is slightly different from the British Victoria Cross. In place of the British For Valour, the inscription Pro Valore is in its place. The new design features the modern rendering of the St Edward's crown (associated with the present Sovereign), as opposed to the more angular Victorian version. The actual casting of the Canadian Victoria Cross was done by the Materials Technology Laboratory of Natural Resources Canada. The first two Canadian Victoria Crosses that were produced were sent to the United Kingdom for the Royal Collection. Other specimens are for the collections of Rideau Hall, the Department of National Defence, Library and Archives Canada, and the Canadian War Museum. There are approximately 20 Canadian Victoria Crosses that exist and are kept at Rideau Hall.
- The Royal Canadian Mint will produce the Sacrifice Medal. The Sacrifice Medal will honour Canadian soldiers, exchange personnel and civilians who have been injured or killed in Afghanistan since October 7, 2001. The reverse for the medal is the Canadian National Vimy Memorial with the word Sacrifice to the right. The obverse of the medal features an effigy of Her Majesty Queen Elizabeth II wearing a Canadian diadem with maple leaves and snowflakes. The words ELIZABETH II DEI GRATIA REGINA and CANADA surround the effigy.

== Long service awards of RCM ==
| Description | Diameter | Material | Weight | Engraved | Case |
|---|---|---|---|---|---|
| Long Service Medal (1950–1979) | 47.6 cm | Sterling Silver (some gold-plated) | unknown | with recipient's name | none |
| Five year pin (since 1980) | 15 cm | Antiquated Bronze | unknown | none | brown felt with beige satin interior |
| Ten year pin (since 1980) | 15 cm | Silver | unknown | none | brown felt with beige satin interior |
| Fifteen Year Medal (since 1980) | 60 mm | Antiquated bronze | 157 grams | With recipients name, dates of employment, some have presentation date | black leather with dark blue felt, white stain included in the interior |
| Retirement Paperweight (since 1980) | 60 mm | Antiquated bronze | 268 grams | With recipients name, dates of employment, date of retirement | unknown |
