= Mule (coin) =

Type of coin in numismatics

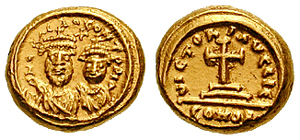
An example of a Heraclius mule

In numismatics, a mule is a coin or medal minted with obverse and reverse designs not normally seen on the same piece. These can be intentional or produced by error. This type of error is highly sought after by collectors, and examples can fetch high prices.

The earliest mules are found among ancient Greek and Roman coins. Opinion is divided between those who think that they are accidental, the result of an incorrect combination of a new die with one that had officially been withdrawn from use, or the work of coiners working with dies stolen from an official mint, perhaps at a time when one of them should have been destroyed.

The name derives from the mule, the hybrid offspring of a horse and a donkey, due to such a coin having two sides intended for different coins, much as a mule has parents of two different species.

== Prominent examples ==
In March 2014 the Royal Mint confirmed a pair of mule 2014 bullion coins struck in 999 fine silver: approximately 38,000 £2 Lunar Horse coins and 17,000 £2 Britannia coins. The Lunar Horses were struck with the denticled Britannia obverse while the Britannias were struck with the non-denticled Lunar Horse obverse.

In February 2009, Coin World reported that some 2007 Abigail Adams medals, from the U.S. Mint, were struck using the reverse from the 2008 Louisa Adams medal, apparently by mistake. These pieces were contained within the 2007 First Spouse medal set. The U.S. Mint has not released an estimate of how many mules were made. eBay prices in March 2009 were reported as high as $925.99.

In 1967, a New Zealand 2 cent coin was issued, featuring the obverse of the Bahamian 5 cent coin, see Coins of the New Zealand dollar.

In June 2009 a rare dateless British 20 pence mule was reported to be in circulation, resulting from the accidental combination of old and new dies in production following a 2008 redesign of UK coinage, with an estimated 50,000 to 200,000 mules released before the error was noticed.

The Winter Olympic coins produced in the Royal Canadian Mint Olympic coins program for the 2010 Winter Olympics in Vancouver featured several mules which entered circulation.

One of the first authentic mule errors to be released by the U.S. Mint (as opposed to the deliberate mules of the mid-1800s) was the 2000 Sacagawea dollar – Washington quarter mule. It features the obverse of a Washington state quarter and the reverse of a Sacagawea dollar. This coin was struck on a Sacagawea dollar planchet. The mint confirmed in July 2000 that the coin was a legitimate error, created by the accidental replacement of a cracked Sacagawea obverse die with a Washington obverse die. Several thousand of the coins were reported to have been minted before the error was discovered, and mint employees recovered and destroyed most of them. As of September 2019, 19 are publicly known to exist and have been certified, of which 16 are owned by a coin collector named Tommy Bolack. A specimen was sold in August 2012 for $155,250.

== "Handsome" mules ==
A "handsome" mule. The telltale difference between the image of the reverse of these two 1958 Franklin halves shown is that the eagle's right wingtip (seen as the viewer's right) on the proof coin has more feathers than on the left coin.

Sometimes mints use proof dies in the production of coins intended for circulation. Coins produced when an identifiable proof die is "married" with a business die are known as "handsome" mules. The details on handsome mules are often noticeably sharper, and thus are distinguishable from ordinary business strikes in circulation.
