= 2000 Sacagawea dollar – Washington quarter mule =

United States error coin

Washington quarter / Sacagawea dollar mule
- United States
- Value: .25 and 1 United States dollar (different face value inscribed on each side)
- Mass: 8.100 g (0.26 troy oz)
- Diameter: 26.49 mm (1.043 in)
- Thickness: 2.00 mm (0.079 in)
- Edge: Plain
- Composition: Core: 100% Cu; Cladding: 77% Cu, 12% Zn, 7% Mn, 4% Ni; Overall: 88.5% Cu, 6% Zn, 3.5% Mn, 2% Ni
- Years of minting: 2000
- Mint marks: P

Obverse
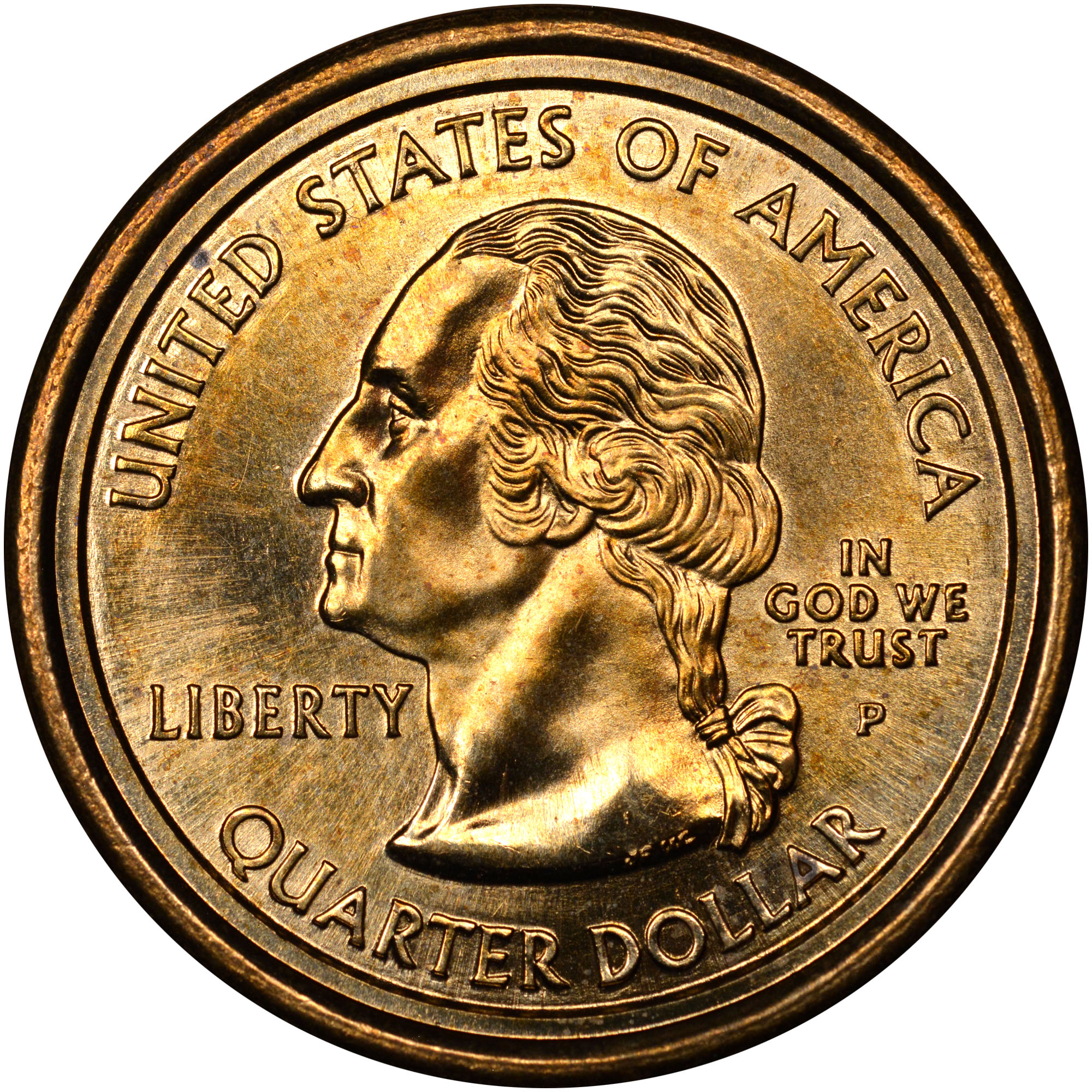
- Design: George Washington
- Designer: John Flanagan (original) / William Cousins (modification to Flanagan's design)
- Design date: 1999

Reverse
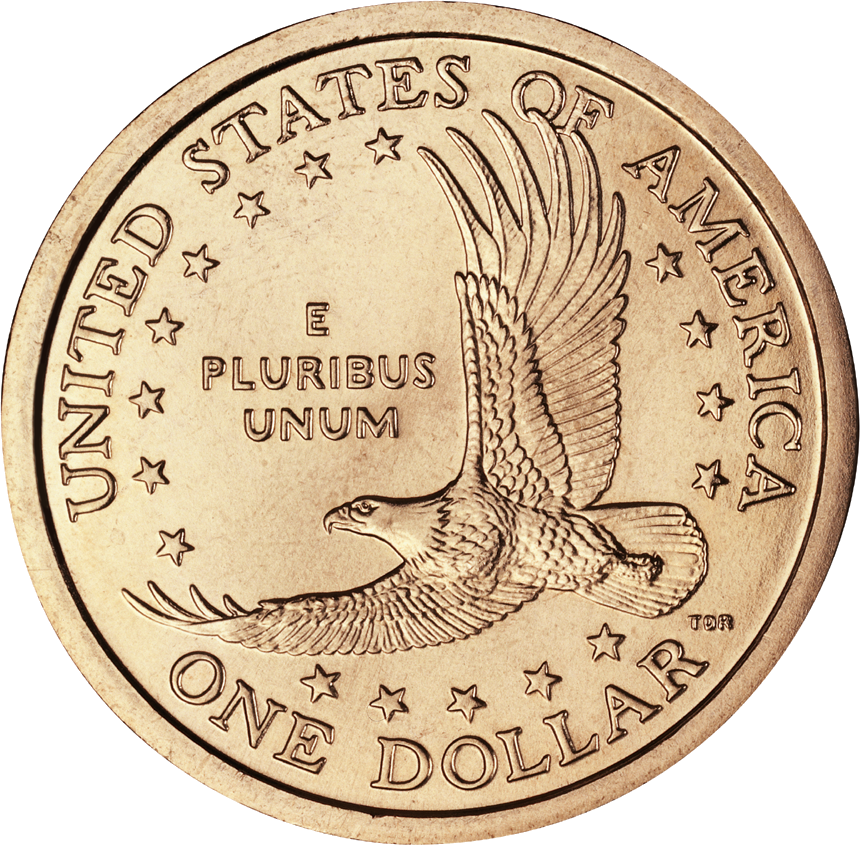
- Design: Soaring eagle
- Designer: Thomas D. Rogers
- Design date: 2000

The 2000 Sacagawea dollar – Washington quarter mule is an error coin featuring the obverse of a Washington quarter (specifically a 50 State quarter) and the reverse of a Sacagawea dollar struck on a gold-colored dollar coin planchet. It is one of the first known authentic mule coins to be released into circulation by the United States Mint.

== History ==
Mule coins were deliberately produced by US Mint employees for sale to coin collectors in the mid-1800s. However, no authentic (accidental) mules of United States currency were known to exist. This changed in the 1990s, when a Lincoln cent (dated 1993-D) with the reverse of a Roosevelt dime were discovered. (Note: A similar Lincoln cent/Roosevelt dime mule dated 1999 is also known, but was discovered after the 2000 dollar coin mule.) In 2000, Frank Wallis of Arkansas discovered a Sacagawea dollar with the obverse of a Washington quarter.

== List of known coins ==
As of September 2019, 19 examples have been confirmed, 16 of which are owned by a coin collector named Tommy Bolack. Three different die pairs have been identified among the examples.

| Coin | Die pair | Discovered | Notes |
|---|---|---|---|
| 1 | #1 | May 2000 | The "Discovery" specimen, owned by Tommy Bolack. Graded MS-66 by the PCGS. |
| 2 | #2 | before July 2000 | Owned by Bolack. Graded MS-67 by the NGC. |
| 3 | #2 | before August 6, 2000 | Owned by Bolack. Graded MS-66 by the NGC. |
| 4 | #1 | before September 2000 | Graded MS-65 by the PCGS. |
| 5 | #3 | September 2000 | Graded MS-67 by the NGC. |
| 6 | #1 | June 2000 | Owned by Bolack. Graded MS-66 by the PCGS. |
| 7 | Unknown | July 2000 | Owned by Bolack. Graded MS-64 by the NGC. |
| 8 | #1 | before June 2001 | Owned by Bolack. Graded MS-66 by the PCGS. |
| 9 | #1 | before June 2001 | Owned by Bolack. Graded MS-65 by the PCGS. |
| 10 | #3 | summer 2000 | Owned by Bolack. Graded MS-65 by the NGC. |
| 11 | #1 | before July 2011 | Graded MS-67 by the NGC. |
| 12 | #1 | before August 2012 | Owned by Bolack. Graded MS-67 by the NGC. |
| 13 | #1 | before 2005 | Owned by Bolack. Graded MS-67 by the NGC. |
| 14 | #1 | before January 2013 | Owned by Bolack. Graded MS-66 by the PCGS. |
| 15 | #1 | before July 2016 | Owned by Bolack. Graded MS-66 by the PCGS. Featured colorful toning. |
| 16 | #1 | before May 2017 | Owned by Bolack. Graded MS-66 by the PCGS. |
| 17 | #1 | before March 22, 2018 | Owned by Bolack. Graded MS-67 by the NGC. |
| 18 | #1 | before January 10, 2019 | Owned by Bolack. Graded MS-67 by the NGC. The die pairing is not noted on the NGC label. |
| 19 | #1 | before March 2017 | Owned by Bolack. Graded MS-67 by the NGC. The die pairing is not noted on the NGC label. |
