= Winter Olympic coins =

Commemorative token remembering Winter Olympic games

Although the first Olympic coin can be traced back to 480 BC, the modern Olympics did not see its first commemoratives until 1951. The original concept of Olympic coins was that the Greeks believed that coins brought the general public closer to the Olympic games. The premise was that those who could not attend the games could at least have a tangible souvenir of the event.

In 1951, the government of Finland authorized the striking of the first modern Olympic coin, a 500 Markkaa. The first Winter Games coin that numismatists could add to their collection was in 1964. An Official Act of the Government of Austria authorized the Austrian Mint to strike a commemorative 50 Schilling coin for the event.

With the exception of Canada's Lucky Loonie program and its 2007 25-cent pieces to commemorate the 2010 Vancouver Olympic Games, it is rare that Olympic coins are minted for circulation. Traditionally, Olympic coins are numismatic coins.

- Please see Summer Olympic coins for details on summer games coins from 1952–1996.
- Please see Summer Olympic Coins (2000-present) for 21st Century Olympic coins.
- Please see Olympic Banknotes for details on all Olympic banknotes.

== Winter Games ==
Year	Event	Host city	Number of coins
1924 2001	I Olympic Winter Games	Chamonix, France	None
1928	II Olympic Winter Games	St. Moritz, Switzerland	None
1932	III Olympic Winter Games	Lake Placid, United States	None
1936	IV Olympic Winter Games	Garmisch-Partenkirchen, Germany	None
1948	V Olympic Winter Games	St. Moritz, Switzerland	None
1952	VI Olympic Winter Games	Oslo, Norway	None
1956	VII Olympic Winter Games	Cortina d'Ampezzo, Italy	None
1960	VIII Olympic Winter Games	Squaw Valley, United States	None
1964	IX Olympic Winter Games	Innsbruck, Austria	1
1968	X Olympic Winter Games	Grenoble, France	None
1972	XI Olympic Winter Games	Sapporo, Japan	1
1976	XII Olympic Winter Games	Innsbruck, Austria	4
1980	XIII Olympic Winter Games	Lake Placid, United States	None
1984	XIV Olympic Winter Games	Sarajevo, Yugoslavia	18
1988	XV Olympic Winter Games	Calgary, Canada	11
1992	XVI Olympic Winter Games	Albertville, France	15
1994	XVII Olympic Winter Games	Lillehammer, Norway	16
1998	XVIII Olympic Winter Games	Nagano, Japan	9
2002	XIX Olympic Winter Games	Salt Lake City, United States	2
2006	XX Olympic Winter Games	Turin, Italy	11
2010	XXI Olympic Winter Games	Vancouver, Canada	17
2014	XXII Olympic Winter Games	Sochi, Russia	46
2018	XXIII Olympic Winter Games	Pyeongchang, South Korea	24
2022	XXIV Olympic Winter Games	Beijing, China	24
2026	XXV Olympic Winter Games	Milan–Cortina d'Ampezzo, Italy	

== Specifications for Winter Games coins ==
=== 1964 Innsbruck Olympics ===
Specifications

Denomination	Reverse Design	Artist	Obverse Design	Artist	Edge	Date of Issue	Finish
50 Schilling	A ski jumper with the Tyrolean Alps in the background, the Olympic rings, the legend: “IX Olympische Winterspiele 1964 Innsbruck” and the name of the artist Grienauer	Edwin Grienauer	The nine coats of arms of the Austrian Federal Provinces, and the legend: “Republik Osterreich” and “50 Schilling”	Arnold Hartig	Lettering on a plain edge: “50 Schilling”	1964	Proof and Circulated

Dimensions

Diameter	Weight	Thickness	Composition	Mintage	Mint Mark	Struck by	Issue Price
34 mm	20 grams	2.35 mm	.900 silver and .100 copper	67,950 (Proof) and 2,832,050 (Circulated)	No Mint marks	Munze Osterreich (Austrian Mint)	50 Austrian Schilling

=== 1972 Sapporo Olympics ===
Specifications

Denomination	Reverse Design	Artist	Obverse Design	Artist	Edge	Date of Issue	Finish
100 Yen	100, the Olympic rings, a snowflake on each side, above the legend: 1972, and a Japanese word meaning Sapporo, and below, a Japanese legend meaning: “year 47 of the reign of Showa”	Mint Officials	The Olympic torch, the legend: Sapporo, the Japanese legend meaning: “Japan” and below, a Japanese text meaning: “100 Yen”	Mint Officials	Milled	1972	Circulated

Dimensions

Diameter	Weight	Thickness	Composition	Mintage	Mint Mark	Struck by	Issue Price
30 mm	12 grams	2.4 mm	Cupronickel (.750 copper and .250 nickel)	30,000,000	No mint marks	The Ministry of Finance, Mint Bureau	100 Yen

=== 1976 Innsbruck Olympics ===
The games were to be held in Denver, Colorado but after two years of preparation, the city withdrew and Innsbruck was chosen to stage the Games. The Hall Mint, one of the oldest mints in Europe was reopened to strike some of the coins.

==== Series One ====
Specifications

Denomination	Reverse Design	Artist	Obverse Design	Artist	Edge	Date of Issue	Finish
100 Schilling	The Innsbruck Olympic emblem, the legend: “XII Olympische Winterspiele”, stylized snowflakes at the bottom, and the artist's name below.	Ferdinand Welz	Ten coats of arms: Republic Eagle of Austria and the arms of the Federal Provinces (See Note)	Edwin Grienauer	Lettering on a plain edge: 100 Schilling	1974	Proof and Circulated

Dimensions

Diameter	Weight	Thickness	Composition	Mintage	Mint Mark	Struck by	Issue Price
36 mm	24 grams	2.70 mm	.640 silver and .360 copper	Proof: 373,600, Circulated: 2,826,400	No mint marks	Munze Osterreich (Austrian Mint)	Proof: 140 Austrian Schilling, Circulated: 100 Austrian Schilling

NOTE: The Federal Provinces are: Burgenland, Carinthia, Lower Austria, Upper Austria, Salzburg, Styria, Tyrol, Vorallberg and Vienna

==== Series Two ====
Specifications

Denomination	Reverse Design	Artist	Obverse Design	Artist	Edge	Date of Issue	Finish
100 Schilling	A townscape Innsbruck, the Olympic rings, the legend: “XII Olympische Winterspiele Innsbruck 1976”, and the name Zelger.	Arthur Zegler and Kutr Baduak	The emblem of Austria with a stylized Austrian eagle and the legend: “Republik Osterreich 100 Schilling”	Helmuth Gsollpointner	Lettering on a plain edge: 100 Schilling	1975	Proof and Circulated

Dimensions

Diameter	Weight	Thickness	Composition	Mintage (Vienna Shield)	Mintage (Hall Eagle)	Mint Mark	Struck by	Issue Price
36 mm	24 grams	2.70 mm	.640 silver and .360 copper	Proof: 232,000, Circulated: 2,718,000	Proof: 223,000, Circulated: 2,692,000	No mint marks	Munze Osterreich (Austrian Mint)	Proof: 150 Austrian Schilling, Circulated: 100 Austrian Schilling

==== Series Three ====
Specifications

Denomination	Reverse Design	Artist	Obverse Design	Artist	Edge	Date of Issue	Finish
100 Schilling	A stylized skier, the legend: “XII Olympische Winterspiele Innsbruck 1976”, and the name Zobl.	Helmut Zobl	The emblem of Austria with a stylized Austrian eagle and the legend: “Republik Osterreich 100 Schilling”	Helmuth Gsollpointner	Lettering on a plain edge: 100 Schilling	1975	Proof and Circulated

Dimensions

Diameter	Weight	Thickness	Composition	Mintage (Vienna Shield)	Mintage (Hall Eagle)	Mint Mark	Struck by	Issue Price
36 mm	24 grams	2.70 mm	.640 silver and .360 copper	Proof: 184,200, Circulated: 2,640,800	Proof: 179,000, Circulated: 2,636,000	No mint marks	Munze Osterreich (Austrian Mint)	Proof: 150 Austrian Schilling, Circulated: 100 Austrian Schilling

==== Series Four ====
Specifications

Denomination	Reverse Design	Artist	Obverse Design	Artist	Edge	Date of Issue	Finish
100 Schilling	The Bergisel ski jump and the Olympic rings with the legend: “XII Olympische Winterspiele Innsbruck 1976”, and above the rings, the words: “Bregisel Schanze”, and the artist’sname Bucheder.	Erwin Bucheder	The emblem of Austria with a stylized Austrian eagle and the legend: “Republik Osterreich 100 Schilling”	Helmuth Gsollpointner	Lettering on a plain edge: 100 Schilling	1975	Proof and Circulated

Dimensions

Diameter	Weight	Thickness	Composition	Mintage (Vienna Shield)	Mintage (Hall Eagle)	Mint Mark	Struck by	Issue Price
36 mm	24 grams	2.70 mm	.640 silver and .360 copper	Proof: 188,000, Circulated: 2,627,000	Proof: 179,400, Circulated: 2,610,600	No mint marks	Munze Osterreich (Austrian Mint)	Proof: 150 Austrian Schilling, Circulated: 100 Austrian Schilling

=== 1984 Sarajevo Olympics ===
At the time, Sarajevo was the second largest city to host the Olympic Winter Games. These were the first Winter Olympic Games that featured gold coins. Marja-Liisa Haemaelaeinen of Finland was the first woman to win three gold medals in cross country skiing. Katarina Witt won her first Olympic gold medal in Figure Skating, and figure skating duo Jayne Torvill and Christopher Dean won the Gold Medal, and performed to the music of Ravel's Bolero.

==== 100 Dinara ====
The dimensions are the same for all the 100 Dinara coins. Each series of coins had the same themes: Culture and History, Ice Sports, and Snow Sports.

- Dimensions

Diameter	Weight	Thickness	Composition	Mint Mark	Struck by
30 mm	13 grams	1.8 mm	.925 silver and .075 copper	No Mintmarks	Zlatara Majdanpek (ZM) and Zavod za izradu novcanica (ZIN)

The artists for all Reverse Designs were Nebojsa Mitric, Dragisa Andric, Dragomir Mileusnic, Djordje Jovanovic, and Ljubisa Mancic. The artist for all Obverse Designs was Nebojsa Mitric.

- Specifications

Series	Reverse Design	Obverse Design	Edge	Date of Issue	Finish	Mintage (ZM)	Mintage (ZIN)	Issue Price
One	Two ice hockey players, and the legend, “XIV Zimske Olimpijske Igre Sarajevo ‘84”, meaning: “XIV Olympic Winter Games Sarajevo ‘84”.	The Olympic emblem of Sarajevo, the emblem of Yugoslavia, and a Cyrillic legend, meaning: “The Socialist Federal Republic of Yugoslavia”	Milled	1982 (released December 15, 1983)	Proof	31,135	46,323	3,375 Dinar ($29.50 US)
Two	A figure skater, and the legend, “XIV Zimske Olimpijske Igre Sarajevo ‘84”, meaning: “XIV Olympic Winter Games Sarajevo ‘84”.	The Olympic emblem of Sarajevo, the emblem of Yugoslavia, and a Cyrillic legend, meaning: “The Socialist Federal Republic of Yugoslavia”	Milled	1983	Proof	58,697	17,614	3,375 Dinar ($29.50 US)
Three	Two man bobsleigh, and the legend, “XIV Zimske Olimpijske Igre Sarajevo ‘84”, meaning: “XIV Olympic Winter Games Sarajevo ‘84”.	The Olympic emblem of Sarajevo, the emblem of Yugoslavia, and a Cyrillic legend, meaning: “The Socialist Federal Republic of Yugoslavia”	Milled	1983	Proof	42,958	5,116	3,375 Dinar ($29.50 US)
Four	Speed skater, and the legend, “XIV Zimske Olimpijske Igre Sarajevo ‘84”, meaning: “XIV Olympic Winter Games Sarajevo ‘84”.	The Olympic emblem of Sarajevo, the emblem of Yugoslavia, and a Cyrillic legend, meaning: “The Socialist Federal Republic of Yugoslavia”	Milled	1984	Proof	39,504	6,188	3,375 Dinar ($29.50 US)
Five	A pair of figure skaters, and the legend, “XIV Zimske Olimpijske Igre Sarajevo ‘84”, meaning: “XIV Olympic Winter Games Sarajevo ‘84”.	The Olympic emblem of Sarajevo, the emblem of Yugoslavia, and a Cyrillic legend, meaning: “The Socialist Federal Republic of Yugoslavia”	Milled	1984	Proof	33,387	8,468	3,375 Dinar ($29.50 US)

==== 250 Dinara ====
The dimensions are the same for all the 250 Dinara coins. Each series of coins had the same themes: Culture and History, Ice Sports, and Snow Sports.

- Dimensions

Diameter	Weight	Thickness	Composition	Mint Mark	Struck by
34 mm	17 grams	1.85 mm	.925 silver and .075 copper	No Mintmarks	Zlatara Majdanpek (ZM) and Zavod za izradu novcanica (ZIN)

The artists for all Reverse Designs were Nebojsa Mitric, Dragisa Andric, Dragomir Mileusnic, Djordje Jovanovic, and Ljubisa Mancic. The artist for all Obverse Designs was Nebojsa Mitric.

- Specifications

Series	Reverse Design	Obverse Design	Edge	Date of Issue	Finish	Mintage (ZM)	Mintage (ZIN)	Issue Price
One	A view of Sarajevo, and the legend, “XIV Zimske Olimpijske Igre Sarajevo ‘84”, meaning: “XIV Olympic Winter Games Sarajevo ‘84”.	The Olympic emblem of Sarajevo, the emblem of Yugoslavia, and a Cyrillic legend, meaning: “The Socialist Federal Republic of Yugoslavia”	Milled	1982 (released December 15, 1983)	Proof	53,499	16,751	4,125 Dinar ($36 US)
Two	Artifacts, the words Leponski VIR, and the legend, “XIV Zimske Olimpijske Igre Sarajevo ‘84”, meaning: “XIV Olympic Winter Games Sarajevo ‘84”.	The Olympic emblem of Sarajevo, the emblem of Yugoslavia, and a Cyrillic legend, meaning: “The Socialist Federal Republic of Yugoslavia”	Milled	1983	Proof	40,448	11,703	4,125 Dinar ($36 US)
Three	Radimlia's tomb, and the legend, “XIV Zimske Olimpijske Igre Sarajevo ‘84”, meaning: “XIV Olympic Winter Games Sarajevo ‘84”.	The Olympic emblem of Sarajevo, the emblem of Yugoslavia, and a Cyrillic legend, meaning: “The Socialist Federal Republic of Yugoslavia”	Milled	1983	Proof	43,247	528	4,125 Dinar ($36 US)
Four	Jajce Village, 29.XI, 1943, and the legend, “XIV Zimske Olimpijske Igre Sarajevo ‘84”, meaning: “XIV Olympic Winter Games Sarajevo ‘84”.	The Olympic emblem of Sarajevo, the emblem of Yugoslavia, and a Cyrillic legend, meaning: “The Socialist Federal Republic of Yugoslavia”	Milled	1984	Proof	38,119	3,649	4,125 Dinar ($36 US)
Five	The effigy of Josip Broz Tito, and the legend, “XIV Zimske Olimpijske Igre Sarajevo ‘84”, meaning: “XIV Olympic Winter Games Sarajevo ‘84”.	The Olympic emblem of Sarajevo, the emblem of Yugoslavia, and a Cyrillic legend, meaning: “The Socialist Federal Republic of Yugoslavia”	Milled	1984	Proof	31,011	5,743	4,125 Dinar ($36 US)

==== 500 Dinara ====
The dimensions are the same for all the 500 Dinara coins. Each series of coins had the same themes: Culture and History, Ice Sports, and Snow Sports.

- Dimensions

Diameter	Weight	Thickness	Composition	Mint Mark	Struck by
38 mm	23 grams	2 mm	.925 silver and .075 copper	No Mintmarks	Zlatara Majdanpek (ZM) and Zavod za izradu novcanica (ZIN)

The artists for all Reverse Designs were Nebojsa Mitric, Dragisa Andric, Dragomir Mileusnic, Djordje Jovanovic, and Ljubisa Mancic. The artist for all Obverse Designs was Nebojsa Mitric.

- Specifications

Series	Reverse Design	Obverse Design	Edge	Date of Issue	Finish	Mintage (ZM)	Mintage (ZIN)	Issue Price
One	A downhill skii\er, and the legend, “XIV Zimske Olimpijske Igre Sarajevo ‘84”, meaning: “XIV Olympic Winter Games Sarajevo ‘84”.	The Olympic emblem of Sarajevo, the emblem of Yugoslavia, and a Cyrillic legend, meaning: “The Socialist Federal Republic of Yugoslavia”	Milled	1982 (released December 15, 1983)	Proof	32,812	37,063	5,125 Dinar ($45 US)
Two	A ski jumper, and the legend, “XIV Zimske Olimpijske Igre Sarajevo ‘84”, meaning: “XIV Olympic Winter Games Sarajevo ‘84”.	The Olympic emblem of Sarajevo, the emblem of Yugoslavia, and a Cyrillic legend, meaning: “The Socialist Federal Republic of Yugoslavia”	Milled	1983	Proof	44,508	12,893	5,125 Dinar ($45 US)
Three	Biathlon, and the legend, “XIV Zimske Olimpijske Igre Sarajevo ‘84”, meaning: “XIV Olympic Winter Games Sarajevo ‘84”.	The Olympic emblem of Sarajevo, the emblem of Yugoslavia, and a Cyrillic legend, meaning: “The Socialist Federal Republic of Yugoslavia”	Milled	1983	Proof	36,962	4,630	5,125 Dinar ($45 US)
Four	A cross-country skier, and the legend, “XIV Zimske Olimpijske Igre Sarajevo ‘84”, meaning: “XIV Olympic Winter Games Sarajevo ‘84”.	The Olympic emblem of Sarajevo, the emblem of Yugoslavia, and a Cyrillic legend, meaning: “The Socialist Federal Republic of Yugoslavia”	Milled	1984	Proof	32,142	7,200	5,125 Dinar ($45 US)
Five	A slalom skier, and the legend, “XIV Zimske Olimpijske Igre Sarajevo ‘84”, meaning: “XIV Olympic Winter Games Sarajevo ‘84”.	The Olympic emblem of Sarajevo, the emblem of Yugoslavia, and a Cyrillic legend, meaning: “The Socialist Federal Republic of Yugoslavia”	Milled	1984	Proof	35,997	258	5,125 Dinar ($45 US)

==== 5000 Dinara ====
The dimensions are the same for all the 5000 Dinara coins.

- Dimensions

Diameter	Weight	Thickness	Composition	Mint Mark	Struck by
24 mm	8 grams	1 mm	.900 gold and .100 copper	No Mintmarks	Zlatara Majdanpek

The artists for all Reverse Designs were Nebojsa Mitric, Dragisa Andric, Dragomir Mileusnic, Djordje Jovanovic, and Ljubisa Mancic. The artist for all Obverse Designs was Nebojsa Mitric.

- Specifications

Reverse Design	Obverse Design	Edge	Date of Issue	Finish	Mintage	Issue Price
The Olympic emblem of Sarajevo, a stylized snowflake, and the legend, “XIV Zimske Olimpijske Igre Sarajevo ‘84”, meaning: “XIV Olympic Winter Games Sarajevo ‘84”.	The Olympic emblem of Sarajevo, the emblem of Yugoslavia, and a Cyrillic legend, meaning: “The Socialist Federal Republic of Yugoslavia”	Milled	1982 (released December 15, 1983)	Proof	23,400	27,625 Dinar ($246 US)
The effigy of Josip Broz Tito, and the legend, “XIV Zimske Olimpijske Igre Sarajevo ‘84”, meaning: “XIV Olympic Winter Games Sarajevo ‘84”.	The Olympic emblem of Sarajevo, the emblem of Yugoslavia, and a Cyrillic legend, meaning: “The Socialist Federal Republic of Yugoslavia”	Milled	1983	Proof	13,874	27,625 Dinar ($246 US)
The Olympic flame, and the legend, “XIV Zimske Olimpijske Igre Sarajevo ‘84”, meaning: “XIV Olympic Winter Games Sarajevo ‘84”.	The Olympic emblem of Sarajevo, the emblem of Yugoslavia, and a Cyrillic legend, meaning: “The Socialist Federal Republic of Yugoslavia”	Milled	1983	Proof	12,948	27,625 Dinar ($246 US)

=== 1988 Calgary Olympics ===
Heading into the 1980s, the Olympics would return to Canada. The city of Calgary would host the 1988 Winter Olympics. Starting in 1985, the Federal Government, under the leadership of then-Prime Minister Brian Mulroney, issued a ten coin set to help finance and commemorate the Olympic games. In similar style to the Montreal Olympics, the RCM would introduce coins with a face value that had never been used before. Said coins would feature a $20 face value. These coins were issued in Proof quality only, and were sold with the partnership of the Royal Bank of Canada. Unlike the Montreal coins, mintage was limited to 5,000,000 coins and this would mark the first time that any silver coin had edge lettering on it. Said lettering was 'XV OLYMPIC WINTER GAMES – JEUX D'OLYMPIQUES D'HIVER.'

==== 20 Dollars ====
Year	Series	Sport	Artist	Mintage	Issue Price
1985	First Series	Downhill Skiing	Ian Stewart	406,360	$37.00
1985	First Series	Speed Skating	Friedrich Peter	354,222	$37.00
1986	Second Series	Hockey	Ian Stewart	396,602	$37.00
1986	Second Series	Biathlon	John Mardon	308,086	$37.00
1986	Third Series	Cross-Country Skiing	Ian Stewart	303,199	$39.50
1986	Third Series	Free-Style Skiing	Walter Ott	294,322	$39.50
1986	Fourth Series	Figure Skating	Raymond Taylor	334,875	$39.50
1986	Fourth Series	Curling	Walter Ott	286,457	$39.50
1987	Fifth Series	Ski-Jumping	Raymond Taylor	290,954	$42.00
1987	Fifth Series	Bobsleigh	John Mardon	274,326	$42.00

==== One Hundred Dollars Gold ====
Year	Theme	Artist	Mintage	Issue Price
1987	XV Olympic Winter Games	Friedrich Peter	145,175	$255.00

=== 1992 Albertville Olympics ===
The Albertville Olympics were the third Olympic Winter games held in France. To commemorate the event, the Government of France authorized the striking of ten gold and nine silver coins.

==== 100 Francs ====
- Dimensions

Diameter	Weight	Thickness	Composition	Mint Mark	Struck by
37 mm	22.2 grams (containing 19.98 grams of silver)	2.1 mm	.900 silver and .100 copper	The Director's mark, the Horn of Plenty, and the Master Engraver's mark, the Dolphin, appear under the word 100 Francs.	Monnaie de Paris

- Specifications

Reverse Design	Artist	Obverse Design	Artist	Edge	Date of Issue	Finish	Mintage	Issue Price
A downhill skier with a view of Mont Blanc in the background, the legend: “République Française”, and the artist's name	Guy Brun	The Olympic emblem of Albertville, the legend: XVIes Jeux Olympiques d’Hiver, the year 1989 and 100 Francs	Mint Engravers	Lettering on a plain edge: Liberté Fraternité Egalité	1989 (June)	Proof	Proof: 300,000	$43 (US), $47 (Cdn)
A pair of figure skaters on the Lac Bourget, the legend: “République Française”, and the artist's name	Georges Yoldjoglou	The Olympic emblem of Albertville, the legend: XVIes Jeux Olympiques d’Hiver, the year 1989 and 100 Francs	Mint Engravers	Lettering on a plain edge: Liberté Fraternité Egalité	1989 (June)	Proof	300,000	$43 (US), $47 (Cdn)
A speed skater, an animal of Savoie (the Marmot), the legend: “République Française”, and the artist's name	Joaquin Jimenez	The Olympic emblem of Albertville, the legend: XVIes Jeux Olympiques d’Hiver, the year 1989 and 100 Francs	Mint Engravers	Lettering on a plain edge: Liberté Fraternité Egalité	1990 (January)	Proof	300,000	$43 (US), $47 (Cdn)
A bobsleigh and a luge of the “Belle Epqoue”, the legend: “République Française”, and the artist's name	Joaquin Jimenez	The Olympic emblem of Albertville, the legend: XVIes Jeux Olympiques d’Hiver, the year 1989 and 100 Francs	Mint Engravers	Lettering on a plain edge: Liberté Fraternité Egalité	1990 (January)	Proof	300,000	$45 (US), $49 (Cdn)
A freestyle skier, a chamois (goat), the legend: “République Française”, and the artist's name	Joaquin Jimenez	The Olympic emblem of Albertville, the legend: XVIes Jeux Olympiques d’Hiver, the year 1989 and 100 Francs	Mint Engravers	Lettering on a plain edge: Liberté Fraternité Egalité	1990 (June)	Proof	300,000	$45 (US), $49 (Cdn)
A slalom skier and a slalom skier of the “Belle Epoque”, the legend: “République Française”, and the artist's name	Joaquin Jimenez	The Olympic emblem of Albertville, the legend: XVIes Jeux Olympiques d’Hiver, the year 1989 and 100 Francs	Mint Engravers	Lettering on a plain edge: Liberté Fraternité Egalité	1990 (June)	Proof	300,000	$45 (US), $49 (Cdn)
Ice hockey players with an ibex (ram), the legend: “République Française”, and the artist's name	Joaquin Jimenez	The Olympic emblem of Albertville, the legend: XVIes Jeux Olympiques d’Hiver, the year 1989 and 100 Francs	Mint Engravers	Lettering on a plain edge: Liberté Fraternité Egalité	1991 (January)	Proof	300,000	$45 (US), $49 (Cdn)
A cross-country skier with a view of the Chateau of the Dukes of Savoie, the legend: “République Française”, and the artist's name	Joaquin Jimenez	The Olympic emblem of Albertville, the legend: XVIes Jeux Olympiques d’Hiver, the year 1989 and 100 Francs	Mint Engravers	Lettering on a plain edge: Liberté Fraternité Egalité	1991 (January)	Proof	300,000	$45 (US), $49 (Cdn)
A ski jumper with a ski jumper of the “Belle Epoque” in the background, the legend: “République Française”, and the artist's name	Georges Yoldjoglou	The Olympic emblem of Albertville, the legend: XVIes Jeux Olympiques d’Hiver, the year 1989 and 100 Francs	Mint Engravers	Lettering on a plain edge: Liberté Fraternité Egalité	1991 (January)	Proof	300,000	$45 (US), $49 (Cdn)

==== 500 Francs ====
- Dimensions

Diameter	Weight	Thickness	Composition	Mint Mark	Struck by
31 mm	17 grams (containing ½ Troy ounce of Gold)	1.5 mm	.920 silver and .080 copper	The Director's mark, the Horn of Plenty, and the Master Engraver's mark, the Dolphin, appear under the word 500 Francs.	Monnaie de Paris

- Specifications

Reverse Design	Artist	Obverse Design	Artist	Edge	Date of Issue	Finish	Mintage	Issue Price
A downhill skier with a view of Mont Blanc in the background, the legend: “République Française”, and the artist's name	Guy Brun	The Olympic emblem of Albertville, the legend: XVIes Jeux Olympiques d’Hiver, the year 1989 and 500 Francs	Mint Engravers	Lettering on a plain edge: Liberté Fraternité Egalité	1989 (June)	Proof	Proof: 30,000	$440 (US), $515 (Cdn)
A pair of figure skaters on the Lac Bourget, the legend: “République Française”, and the artist's name	Georges Yoldjoglou	The Olympic emblem of Albertville, the legend: XVIes Jeux Olympiques d’Hiver, the year 1989 and 500 Francs	Mint Engravers	Lettering on a plain edge: Liberté Fraternité Egalité	1989 (June)	Proof	30,000	$440 (US), $515 (Cdn)
A speed skater, an animal of Savoie (the Marmot), the legend: “République Française”, and the artist's name	Joaquin Jimenez	The Olympic emblem of Albertville, the legend: XVIes Jeux Olympiques d’Hiver, the year 1989 and 500 Francs	Mint Engravers	Lettering on a plain edge: Liberté Fraternité Egalité	1990 (January)	Proof	30,000	$440 (US), $515 (Cdn)
A bobsleigh and a luge of the “Belle Epqoue”, the legend: “République Française”, and the artist's name	Joaquin Jimenez	The Olympic emblem of Albertville, the legend: XVIes Jeux Olympiques d’Hiver, the year 1989 and 500 Francs	Mint Engravers	Lettering on a plain edge: Liberté Fraternité Egalité	1990 (January)	Proof	30,000	$440 (US), $515 (Cdn)
A freestyle skier, a chamois (goat), the legend: “République Française”, and the artist's name	Joaquin Jimenez	The Olympic emblem of Albertville, the legend: XVIes Jeux Olympiques d’Hiver, the year 1989 and 500 Francs	Mint Engravers	Lettering on a plain edge: Liberté Fraternité Egalité	1990 (June)	Proof	30,000	$440 (US), $515 (Cdn)
A slalom skier and a slalom skier of the “Belle Epoque”, the legend: “République Française”, and the artist's name	Joaquin Jimenez	The Olympic emblem of Albertville, the legend: XVIes Jeux Olympiques d’Hiver, the year 1989 and 500 Francs	Mint Engravers	Lettering on a plain edge: Liberté Fraternité Egalité	1990 (June)	Proof	30,000	$440 (US), $515 (Cdn)
Ice hockey players with an ibex (ram), the legend: “République Française”, and the artist's name	Joaquin Jimenez	The Olympic emblem of Albertville, the legend: XVIes Jeux Olympiques d’Hiver, the year 1989 and 500 Francs	Mint Engravers	Lettering on a plain edge: Liberté Fraternité Egalité	1991 (January)	Proof	30,000	$440 (US), $515 (Cdn)
A cross-country skier with a view of the Chateau of the Dukes of Savoie, the legend: “République Française”, and the artist's name	Joaquin Jimenez	The Olympic emblem of Albertville, the legend: XVIes Jeux Olympiques d’Hiver, the year 1989 and 500 Francs	Mint Engravers	Lettering on a plain edge: Liberté Fraternité Egalité	1991 (January)	Proof	30,000	$440 (US), $515 (Cdn)
A ski jumper with a ski jumper of the “Belle Epoque” in the background, the legend: “République Française”, and the artist's name	Georges Yoldjoglou	The Olympic emblem of Albertville, the legend: XVIes Jeux Olympiques d’Hiver, the year 1989 and 500 Francs	Mint Engravers	Lettering on a plain edge: Liberté Fraternité Egalité	1991 (January)	Proof	30,000	$440 (US), $515 (Cdn)
Pierre Baron de Coubertin, a Greek column on the left, RF, the legend: “République Française”, and the artist's name	Georges Yoldjoglou	The Olympic emblem of Albertville, the legend: XVIes Jeux Olympiques d’Hiver, the year 1989 and 500 Francs	Mint Engravers	Lettering on a plain edge: Liberté Fraternité Egalité	1991	Proof	30,000	$440 (US), $515 (Cdn)

=== 1998 Nagano Olympics ===
==== Series One ====
Year	Composition	Weight	Diameter	Sport
1997	Gold	15.6 grams	26 mm	Skiing
1997	Silver	15 grams	30 mm	Hockey
1997	Nickel	7.2 grams	26.5 mm	Snowboarding

==== Series Two ====
Year	Composition	Weight	Diameter	Sport
1997	Gold	15.6 grams	26 mm	Figure Skating
1997	Silver	15 grams	30 mm	Biathlon
1997	Nickel	7.2 grams	26.5 mm	Snowboarding

==== Series Three ====
Year	Composition	Weight	Diameter	Sport
1998	Gold	15.6 grams	26 mm	Speed Skating
1998	Silver	15 grams	30 mm	Ski Jumping
1998	Nickel	7.2 grams	26.5 mm	Freestyle Skiing

=== 2002 Salt Lake City Olympics ===
==== One Dollar ====
Due to the abject failure of the 1996 program, this year's coins were limited to one silver and one gold piece each.

Year	Composition	Theme	Mintage	US Mint Facility	Engraver	Obverse Design	Designer	Reverse Design
2002	Silver	Salt Lake City Olympics	400,000	Philadelphia, PA (Proof/Uncirculated)	John Mercanti	Crystal Emblem superimposed on top of the Games' secondary identity mark entitled: "Rhythm of the Land."	Donna Weaver	Salt Lake City skyline with the Rocky Mountains in the background.

==== Five Dollars ====
Year	Composition	Theme	Mintage	US Mint Facility	Engraver	Obverse Design	Designer	Reverse Design
2002	Gold	Salt Lake City Olympics	80,000	West Point, NY (Proof/Uncirculated)	Donna Weaver	Crystal Emblem superimposed on top of the Games' secondary identity mark entitled: "Rhythm of the Land."	Donna Weaver	Olympic flame in relief atop a cauldron.

=== 2006 Turin Games ===
A total of 11 coins were minted for the Turin Olympic Games. There were five gold coins and six silver coins. The Silver coins feature the complete line-up of sterling silver coins that have been issued by the Italian State Mint (IPZS) to highlight six of the major disciplines that will be held during the XX Olympic Winter Games Torino 2006. Each coin is struck in proof finish.

==== Base Metal Coins ====
Image	Dimensions	Feature	Volume	Date
	Diameter: 25.75mm Thickness:2.20mm; Mass: 8.5g	2006 Winter Olympics in Turin	40 million coins	First date of issue: 10 January 2006; First date of circulation: 10 February 2006
Description: The coin depicts a racing skier and the visitor attraction of Turin, the Mole Antonelliana (which incidentally is also depicted on the Italian 2 cent coin), together with a large number of inscriptions: above the skier's head, GIOCHI INVERNALI (Winter Games); below the tower, the name of the host city TORINO; beside the skier's left thigh, the engraver's initials (MCC); also to the left of the skier, the year mark (written vertically); and finally, to the left of the tower, the monogram of the Italian Republic (RI) and the mint mark (R). The twelve stars of the European Union surround the design on the outer ring of the coin.

==== Silver Coins ====
Five Euros

Composition	Finish	Weight (g)	Diameter (mm)	Reverse	Obverse
.925 sterling silver	Proof	18 g	32 mm	The stylized silhouette of the Mole Antonelliana, Turin's tower landmark	Figure skating, ski jumping and cross-country skiing

Ten Euros

Composition	Finish	Weight (g)	Diameter (mm)	Reverse	Obverse
.925 sterling silver	Proof	22 g	34 mm	The stylized silhouette of the Mole Antonelliana, Turin's tower landmark	Alpine skiing, speed skating and ice hockey

==== Gold Coin ====
Fifty Euros

Composition	Finish	Weight (g)	Diameter (mm)	Reverse	Obverse
.900 gold	Proof	16.129 g	28 mm	The stylized silhouette of the Mole Antonelliana, Turin's tower landmark	Torch Relay

=== 2010 Vancouver Olympics ===
The Royal Canadian Mint held a press conference in Calgary, Alberta to announce the release of the Vancouver Olympic commemorative coins. The newest denomination for the Vancouver Olympic coins is twenty-five dollars. The twenty-five dollar coins are the first Modern Olympic coins ever to have a hologram on the reverse. The RCM plans to release 12 twenty-five dollar coins, 10 seventy-five dollar coins, 3 14-karat coins, and 4 one kilogram coins (two in silver, two in gold).

With regards to the circulation coins, one of the novelties is that D.G. Regina will be removed from the Queen's effigy, making the 25-cent coins the first "godless circulating coins" since the 1911 issue of King George V. The first circulating $1 coin will be dated 2008 but the obverse will be the standard effigy of Queen Elizabeth II by Susanna Blunt with the wording "ELIZABETH II" and "D.G. REGINA" with the Circle M privy mark.

==== Twenty-Five Cents ====
Specifications

Years	Weight	Diameter/Shape	Composition
2007–present	4.4 g	23.88 mm	94.0% steel, 3.8% copper, 2.2% nickel plating

There have been a couple of circulation mules in this series. 2007 Paralympic wheelchair curling and 2009 bobsleigh

Details

Date of Issue	Sport	Artist	Mintage
February 24, 2007	Curling	Glen Green	22,000,000
April 4, 2007	Ice Hockey	Glen Green	22,000,000
July 11, 2007	Wheelchair curling	Glen Green	22,000,000
September 12, 2007	Biathlon	Glen Green	22,000,000
October 24, 2007	Alpine Skiing	Glen Green	22,000,000
February 20, 2008	Snowboarding	Glen Green	22,000,000
April 16, 2008	Freestyle Skiing	Glen Green	22,000,000
November 18, 2008	Figure Skating	G.G.	TBD
January 15, 2009	Cross Country Skiing	G.G.	TBD
March 12, 2009	Speed Skating	TBD	TBD
June 23, 2009	Bobsleigh	G.G.	TBD
September, 2009	Men's Ice Hockey	Jason Bouwman	29,000,000
November, 2009	Women's Ice Hockey	Jason Bouwman	29,000,000
January, 2010	Cindy Klassen	S.B. & RCM engravers	TBD
March, 2010	Ice sledge hockey	G.G.	TBD

==== Mascot Coins ====
Year	Mascot	Diameter	Weight	Issue Price
2008	Miga	23.88mm	4.4 g	$15.95
2008	Quatchi	23.88mm	4.4 g	$15.95
2008	Sumi	23.88mm	4.4 g	$15.95

==== One Dollar ====
Date of Issue	Theme	Artist	Mintage
February 15, 2010	Innukshuk		

==== Twenty-Five Dollars ====
Specifications

Denomination	Reverse Design	Artist	Obverse Design	Artist	Edge	Date of Issue	Finish
Twenty-Five Dollars	Curling	Steve Hepburn	The image of Queen Elizabeth II plus Innukshuk, the logo of the 2010 Games	Susanna Blunt	Serrated	February 23, 2007	Proof with selective hologram on the reverse
Twenty-Five Dollars	Ice Hockey	Steve Hepburn	The image of Queen Elizabeth II plus Innukshuk, the logo of the 2010 Games	Susanna Blunt	Serrated	April 4, 2007	Proof with selective hologram on the reverse
Twenty-Five Dollars	Athlete's Pride	Shelagh Armstrong	The image of Queen Elizabeth II plus Innukshuk, the logo of the 2010 Games	Susanna Blunt	Serrated	July 11, 2007	Proof with selective hologram on the reverse
Twenty-Five Dollars	Biathlon	Bonnie Ross	The image of Queen Elizabeth II plus Innukshuk, the logo of the 2010 Games	Susanna Blunt	Serrated	September 12, 2007	Proof with selective hologram on the reverse
Twenty-Five Dollars	Alpine Skiing	Brian Hughes	The image of Queen Elizabeth II plus Innukshuk, the logo of the 2010 Games	Susanna Blunt	Serrated	October 24, 2007	Proof with selective hologram on the reverse
Twenty-Five Dollars	Snowboarding	Steve Hepburn	The image of Queen Elizabeth II plus Innukshuk, the logo of the 2010 Games	Susanna Blunt	Serrated	February 20, 2008	Proof with selective hologram on the reverse
Twenty-Five Dollars	Freestyle Skiing	John Mardon	The image of Queen Elizabeth II plus Innukshuk, the logo of the 2010 Games	Susanna Blunt	Serrated	April 16, 2008	Proof with selective hologram on the reverse

Dimensions

Diameter	Weight	Thickness	Composition	Mintage	Mint Mark	Struck by	Issue Price
40 mm	27.78 grams	N/A	.925 silver and .075 copper	45,000	No Mint marks	Royal Canadian Mint	$69.95

==== Seventy-Five Dollars ====
Specifications

Denomination	Reverse Design	Artist	Obverse Design	Artist	Edge	Date of Issue	Finish
Seventy-Five Dollars	An officer of the RCMP mounted on a horse.	Cecily Mok	The image of Queen Elizabeth II plus Innukshuk, the logo of the 2010 Games	Susanna Blunt	Serrated	February 24, 2007	Proof with selective colouring on the reverse
Seventy-Five Dollars	Two athletes holding a Canadian flag.	Shelagh Armstrong	The image of Queen Elizabeth II plus Innukshuk, the logo of the 2010 Games	Susanna Blunt	Serrated	July 11, 2007	Proof with selective colouring on the reverse
Seventy-Five Dollars	Canada Geese	Kerri Burnett	The image of Queen Elizabeth II plus Innukshuk, the logo of the 2010 Games	Susanna Blunt	Serrated	October 24, 2007	Proof with selective colouring on the reverse
Seventy-Five Dollars	Four Host First Nations mask	Jody Broomfeld	The image of Queen Elizabeth II plus Innukshuk, the logo of the 2010 Games	Susanna Blunt	Serrated	February 20, 2008	Proof with selective colouring on the reverse

Dimensions

Diameter	Weight	Thickness	Composition	Mintage	Mint Mark	Struck by	Issue Price
27 mm	12 grams	N/A	58.33% gold and 41.67% silver	8,000	No Mint marks	Royal Canadian Mint	$389.95

==== Two Hundred and Fifty Dollars ====
Specifications

Denomination	Reverse Design	Artist	Obverse Design	Artist	Edge	Date of Issue	Finish
Two Hundred and Fifty Dollars	Images of Canada prior to European settlement.	Stanley Witten	The image of Queen Elizabeth II plus Innukshuk, the logo of the 2010 Games	Susanna Blunt	Plain	February 24, 2007	Proof
Two Hundred and Fifty Dollars	Images of Canada in the 16th century.	Susan Taylor	The image of Queen Elizabeth II plus Innukshuk, the logo of the 2010 Games	Susanna Blunt	Plain	March 20, 2008	Proof

Dimensions

Diameter	Weight	Thickness	Composition	Mintage	Mint Mark	Struck by	Issue Price
101.6 mm	1 kilogram	N/A	99.99% silver	2,500	No Mint marks	Royal Canadian Mint	$1,299.95

==== Three Hundred Dollars ====
Specifications

Denomination	Reverse Design	Artist	Obverse Design	Artist	Edge	Date of Issue	Finish
Three Hundred Dollars	A diverse group of many faces surrounds the outer ring of the coin while the inner core of the coin features the Olympic Torch and the images of Greek gods.	Laurie McGaw (outer ring), David Craig (inner core)	The image of Queen Elizabeth II plus Innukshuk, the logo of the 2010 Games	Susanna Blunt	Serrated	February 24, 2007	Proof
Three Hundred Dollars	A diverse group of many faces surrounds the outer ring of the coin while the inner core of the coin features the Olympic Torch and the images of skiers and a speed skater.	Laurie McGaw (outer ring), David Craig (inner core)	The image of Queen Elizabeth II plus Innukshuk, the logo of the 2010 Games	Susanna Blunt	Serrated	February 20, 2008	Proof

Dimensions

Diameter	Weight	Thickness	Composition	Mintage	Mint Mark	Struck by	Issue Price
50 mm	60 grams	N/A	58.33% gold and 41.67% silver	2,500	No Mint marks	Royal Canadian Mint	$1,499.95

==== Two Thousand Five Hundred Dollars ====
Specifications

Denomination	Reverse Design	Artist	Obverse Design	Artist	Edge	Date of Issue	Finish
Two Thousand Five Hundred Dollars	Images of Canada prior to European settlement.	Stanley Witten	The image of Queen Elizabeth II plus Innukshuk, the logo of the 2010 Games	Susanna Blunt	Plain	2007	Proof
Two Thousand Five Hundred Dollars	Images of Canada in the 16th century.	Susan Taylor	The image of Queen Elizabeth II plus Innukshuk, the logo of the 2010 Games	Susanna Blunt	Plain	March 20, 2008	Proof

Dimensions

Diameter	Weight	Thickness	Composition	Mintage	Mint Mark	Struck by	Issue Price
101.6 mm	1 kilogram	N/A	99.99% gold	20	No Mint marks	Royal Canadian Mint	$36,000.00

==== Bullion Coins ====
The Royal Canadian Mint and the International Olympic Committee have reached an agreement on Olympic Gold and Silver Maple Leaf coins. The announcement was made on August 3, 2007 and the agreement allows the RCM to strike bullion coins with the emblems of the 2010 Olympic and Paralympic Games. The issue will consist of two coins: one Gold Maple Leaf coin and a Canadian Silver Maple Leaf coin and both coins will feature the date of 2008. The new agreement means that the RCM is now selling Olympic coins through all of its major business lines: bullion, circulation, numismatics.

Year of issue	Diameter	Theme
2008	38 mm	Innukshuk
2009	38 mm	Raven
2010	38 mm	Ice hockey

=== 2014 Sochi Olympics ===
==== Commemorative Coins of Base Metals ====
Specifications

Years	Weight	Diameter/Shape	Composition	Denomination
2011–2013	10.00 g	27.00 mm	cupro-nickel	25 rubles

Details

Year of Issue	Obverse	Reverse	Artist	Mintage
2011	In the center is the relief image of the National Coat of Arms of the Russian Federation. Above is the semicircular inscription along the rim, stating "РОССИЙСКАЯ ФЕДЕРАЦИЯ", framed on both sides by ornamental elements of doubled rhombuses. In the lower part of the disc, at the edge - the horizontal inscription: "25 РУБЛЕЙ" (25 RUBLES) and the date: "2011 г." (2011) under it, over it to the right - the mint trade mark.	In the central part of the disc against the background of a mountain - the horizontal inscription: "sochi.ru", under it on the section of the shade cast by the mountain - the date: "2014" and five Olympic rings.	E.V. Kramskaya (obverse), A.D, Schablykin (reverse).	9750000
2012	In the center is the relief image of the National Coat of Arms of the Russian Federation. Over it along the rim is the semicircular inscription: "РОССИЙСКАЯ ФЕДЕРАЦИЯ" (THE RUSSIAN FEDERATION). Under the coat of arms, in two lines are the denomination of the coin: "25 РУБЛЕЙ" (25 RUBLES) and the year of issue: "2012 г." (2012). To the right is the trade mark of the Saint Petersburg Mint.	The relief images of three mascots and the Emblem of the XXII Olympic Winter Games of 2014 in Sochi.	E.V. Kramskaya (obverse), A.A. Brynza (reverse).	9750000
2013	In the center is the relief image of the National Coat of Arms of the Russian Federation. Over it along the rim is the semicircular inscription: "РОССИЙСКАЯ ФЕДЕРАЦИЯ" (THE RUSSIAN FEDERATION). Under the coat of arms, in two lines are the denomination of the coin: "25 РУБЛЕЙ" (25 RUBLES) and the year of issue: "2013 г." (2013). To the right is the trade mark of the Saint Petersburg Mint.	The relief images of two mascots and the Emblem of the XI Olympic Winter Games of 2014 in Sochi.	E.V. Kramskaya (obverse)	9750000

=== Commemorative coins of base metals ===
Years	Weight	Diameter/Shape	Composition	Denomination
2016-2017	26 g.	40mm/Circular	Brass	1,000 won

=== 2026 Milano–Cortina d'Ampezzo Olympics ===
==== One ounce gold ====
Specifications

Denomination	Reverse Design	Artist	Obverse Design	Artist	Edge	Date of Issue	Finish
50 Euro	"Viaggio della torcia olimpica" (Olympic torch rely) with logo	Antonio Vecchio	Logo of the 2026 Games	Antonio Vecchio	Fine milled	27 August 2025	Proof
50 Euro	Mascot skiing	Antonio Vecchio	Logo of the 2026 Games	Antonio Vecchio	Continuous milled	11 February 2026	Reverse proof

Dimensions

Diameter	Weight	Thickness	Composition	Mintage	Mint Mark	Struck by	Issue Price
28 mm.	31,104 g.		999.9% gold	750 (2025 model), 500 (2026 model)		Istituto Poligrafico e Zecca dello Stato	€ 3,450.00 (2025 model), € 4,999.00 (2026 model)

==== Twenty Euro gold ====
Specifications

Denomination	Reverse Design	Artist	Obverse Design	Artist	Edge	Date of Issue	Finish
20 Euro	"Viaggio della torcia olimpica" (Olympic torch rely) with logo	Antonio Vecchio	Logo of the 2026 Games (Olympic)	Antonio Vecchio	Continuous coarse milled	27 February 2025	Proof
20 Euro	"Viaggio della torcia olimpica" (Olympic torch rely) with logo	Antonio Vecchio	Logo of the 2026 Games (Paralympic)	Antonio Vecchio	Continuous coarse milled	27 February 2025	Proof
20 Euro	Mascot skiing	Antonio Vecchio	Logo of the 2026 Games (Olympic)	Antonio Vecchio	Continuous milled	11 February 2026	Reverse proof

Dimensions

Diameter	Weight	Thickness	Composition	Mintage	Mint Mark	Struck by	Issue Price
22 mm.	7,776 g.		999.9% gold	2,000 each (2025 models), 1,000 (2026 model)		Istituto Poligrafico e Zecca dello Stato	€ 869.00 (2025 models), € 1,300.00 (2026 model)

==== Six Euro silver ====
Specifications

Denomination	Reverse Design	Artist	Obverse Design	Artist	Edge	Date of Issue	Finish
6 Euro	Logo of the 2026 Games	Antonio Vecchio	Curling - Cortina d'Ampezzo	Antonio Vecchio	Continuous coarse milled	18 March 2025	Proof
6 Euro	Logo of the 2026 Games	Antonio Vecchio	Speed skating - Milano	Silvia Petrassi	Continuous coarse milled	18 March 2025	Proof
6 Euro	Logo of the 2026 Games	Antonio Vecchio	Snowboard - Livigno	Antonio Vecchio	Continuous coarse milled	17 April 2025	Proof
6 Euro	Logo of the 2026 Games	Antonio Vecchio	Ski Jumping - Predazzo	Silvia Petrassi	Continuous coarse milled	17 April 2025	Proof
6 Euro	Logo of the 2026 Games	Antonio Vecchio	Alpine skiing - Bormio	Antonio Vecchio	Continuous coarse milled	15 May 2025	Proof
6 Euro	Logo of the 2026 Games	Antonio Vecchio	Paralympics cross-country skiing - Tesero	Silvia Petrassi	Continuous coarse milled	15 May 2025	Proof

Dimensions

Diameter	Weight	Thickness	Composition	Mintage	Mint Mark	Struck by	Issue Price
38,61 mm.	31,104 g.		999% silver	5,000 each		Istituto Poligrafico e Zecca dello Stato	€ 83.00

==== 1/4 Euro (25 cent) ====
Specifications

Denomination	Reverse Design	Artist	Obverse Design	Artist	Edge	Date of Issue	Finish
1/4 Euro	Logo of the 2026 Games	Antonio Vecchio	Milan Cathedral	Antonio Vecchio	Discontinuous fine milled	15 May 2025	Brilliant Uncirculated
1/4 Euro	Logo of the 2026 Games	Antonio Vecchio	Cortina d'Ampezzo mountains skyline	Silvia Petrassi	Discontinuous fine milled	15 May 2025	Brilliant Uncirculated
1/4 Euro	Logo of the 2026 Games	Antonio Vecchio	Olympic mascot	Silvia Petrassi	Discontinuous fine milled	15 May 2025	Brilliant Uncirculated

Dimensions

Diameter	Weight	Thickness	Composition	Mintage	Mint Mark	Struck by	Issue Price
23,25 mm.	7 g.		Cupronickel	6,000 rolls (25 pcs) each		Istituto Poligrafico e Zecca dello Stato	€ 50.00
