= Toonie =

Canadian two-dollar coin

Two dollars
- Canada
- Value: 2.00 Canadian dollar
- Mass: 6.92 g
- Diameter: 28 mm
- Thickness: 1.75 mm
- Edge: Intermittent milled/smooth, engraving: maple leaf, "Canada", maple leaf, "2 dollars"
- Composition: Outer ring: steel, nickel plating; Inner core: aluminum bronze, brass plating
- Years of minting: 1996–present

Obverse
- Design: Charles III, King of Canada
- Designer: Steven Rosati
- Design date: 2023

Reverse
- Design: Polar bear in early summer on an ice floe
- Designer: Brent Townsend
- Design date: 2012

In Canada, the toonie (also spelled twonie or twoonie), formally the two-dollar coin (French: pièce de 2 dollars canadiens, nicknamed deux piastres or deux piastres rond), was introduced on February 19, 1996, by Minister of Public Works Diane Marleau. As of 2025, it possesses the highest monetary value of any circulating Canadian coin: two dollars. The toonie is a bi-metallic coin which on the reverse side features an image of a polar bear by artist Brent Townsend. The obverse, since 2023, bears a portrait of King Charles III. It has the words "Charles III / D.G. Rex"; before 2023, the words were in a typeface different than that used on other Canadian coins.

The coin is manufactured using a patented distinctive bi-metallic coin-locking mechanism. The coins are estimated to last 20 years. The discontinued two-dollar bill was less expensive to manufacture but lasted only one year on average.

On April 10, 2012, the Royal Canadian Mint (RCM) announced design changes to the loonie and toonie, which include new security features.

Coins minted prior to 2012 consist of an aluminum bronze inner core with a pure nickel outer ring; but in March–May 2012, the composition of the inner core switched to aluminum bronze coated with multi-ply plated brass, and the outer ring switched to steel coated with multi-ply plated nickel. The weight dropped from 7.30 to 6.92 g, and the thickness changed from 1.8 to 1.75 mm. The Mint said that multi-ply plated steel technology, already used in Canada's smaller coinage, produces an electromagnetic signature that is harder to counterfeit than that of regular alloy coins; also, using steel provides cost savings and avoids fluctuations in the price or supply of nickel.

== Naming ==
"Toonie" is a portmanteau word combining the number "two" with the common name of Canada's one-dollar coin, the loonie. It is occasionally spelled "twonie" or "twoonie", but Canadian newspapers and the Royal Canadian Mint (RCM) use the "toonie" spelling.

Jack Iyerak Anawak, member of Parliament from Nunatsiaq (the electoral district representing what is now the territory of Nunavut), suggested the name "Nanuq" [nanook, polar bear] in honour of the Inuit and their northern culture; however, this proposal went largely unnoticed beside the popular "toonie".

The name "toonie" became so widely accepted that in 2006, the RCM secured the rights to it. A competition to name the bear resulted in the name "Churchill", a reference both to Winston Churchill and to the common polar bear sightings in Churchill, Manitoba.

== Launch ==
Finance Minister Paul Martin announced the replacement of the $2 banknote with a coin in the 1995 Canadian federal budget speech. The RCM spent $17,400 to canvass 2,000 Canadian households regarding which of the 10 theme options they preferred.

Under the direction of Hieu C. Truong, the RCM engineering division designed the two-dollar coin to be made from two different metals. The metals for the bimetallic coin would be lighter and thinner than those produced anywhere in the world. To join the two parts, the engineering division selected a bimechanical locking mechanism. By the end of 1996, the Winnipeg facility had struck 375 million of these coins. The coin was officially launched at Ben's Deli in Montreal on February 19, 1996.

The weight of the coin was originally specified as 112.64 grains (7.299 g).

The community of Campbellford, Ontario, home to the coin's designer, constructed an 8-metre-tall (26 ft) toonie monument, similar to the "Big Loonie" in Echo Bay and the Big Nickel in Sudbury.

Unlike the loonie before it, the toonie and the $2 bill were not produced concurrently with each other, as the $2 bill was withdrawn from circulation on February 16, 1996, three days prior to the toonie's introduction.

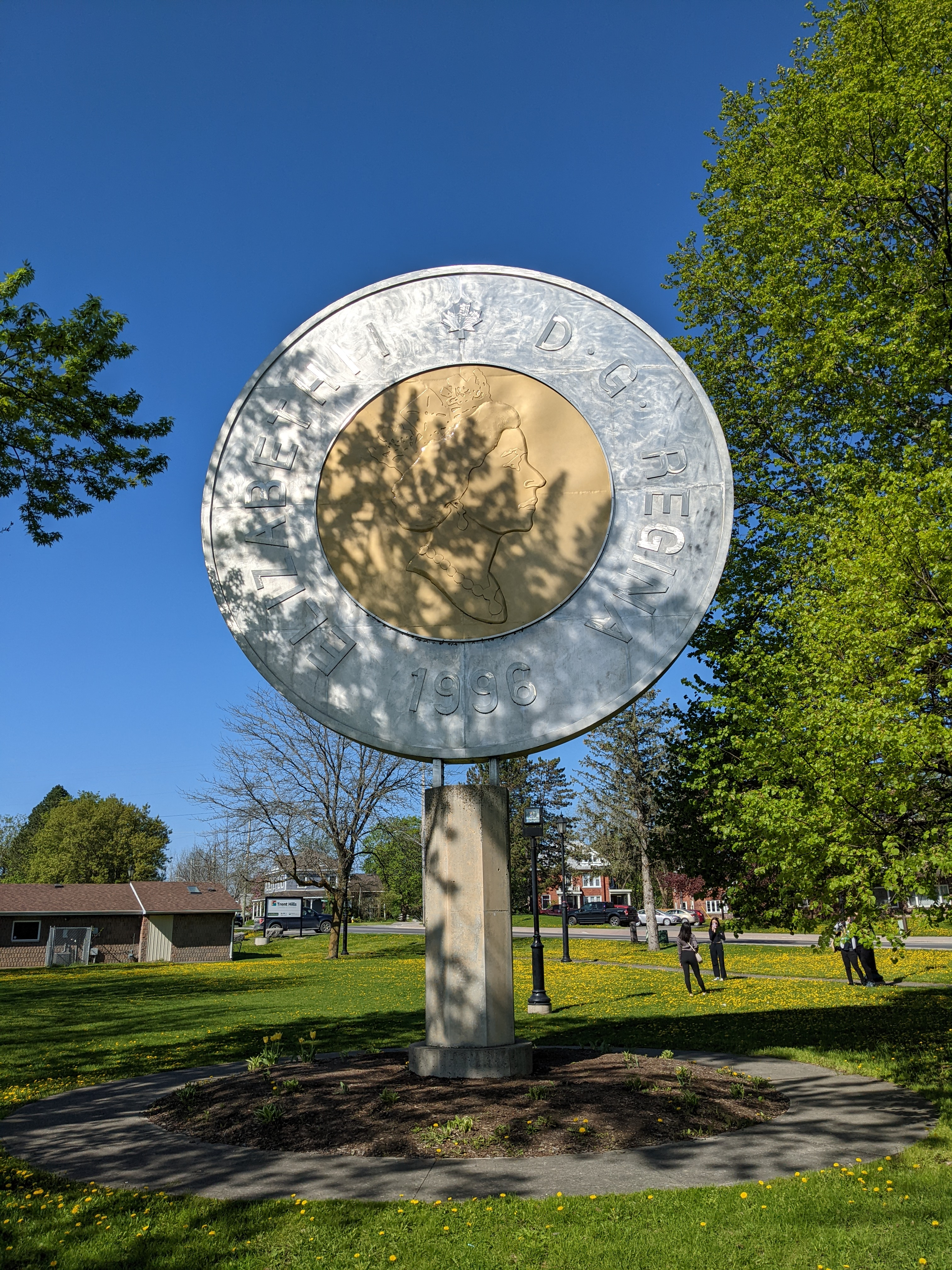
Obverse of the Giant Toonie Monument in Campbellford, Ontario

== Commemorative editions ==
Commemorative editions of the Canadian $2 coin
Year	Theme	Artist	Mintage	Notes
1999	The founding of Nunavut	G. Arnaktavyok	25,130,000	The coin features an Inuk drummer.
2000	Knowledge/Le Savoir	Tony Bianco	29,880,000	Millennium edition, the coin value "2 dollars" appears on the obverse instead of on the reverse. It also features three polar bears. The issue date of the 2000 coin is on the reverse instead of the obverse side.
2006	Churchill, 10th anniversary of $2 coin	Tony Bianco	5,005,000	Featuring an updated pose of the bear looking up at the dramatic lines of the aurora borealis. The first circulation coin to be introduced with the new mintmark. The issue date reads 1996–2006.
2008	Québec, 400th anniversary of founding of Quebec City, the first French settlement in North America	The coin was designed by jeweller Geneviève Bertrand, a Quebec City native. The engraving was done by RCM engraver William Woodruff.	6,010,000	The design of the coin is dominated by a large fleur-de-lis. Other elements include a ship and lines representing the St. Lawrence River.
2011	Boreal Forest, honouring Canada's boreal forest dedicated to the centennial of Parks Canada.	Nolin BBDO Montreal	5,000,000	Features three stylized trees, a bird, and a man.
2012	War of 1812: HMS Shannon	Bonnie Ross	5,000,000	Part of a series of commemorative issues on the War of 1812. Features a modified reverse with HMS Shannon in the centre core, as well as artwork with "The War of 1812, HMS Shannon" in the outer ring.
2014	Wait for Me Daddy	Claude Dettloff	5,000,000	Inspired by the iconic photograph Wait for Me, Daddy, which was taken on October 1, 1940, in New Westminster, British Columbia, by photographer Claude Dettloff.
2015	200th anniversary of the birth of John A. Macdonald	Glen Green	5,000,000	The design features a portrait of John A. Macdonald superimposed on the map of Canada in the centre; in the outer ring are the dates "1815" and "2015". 2,150,000 of these coins were produced in 2014 (though still dated 2015), with the remaining 2,850,000 being produced in 2015.
2015	100th anniversary of the poem "In Flanders Fields"	Glen Loates	5,000,000	Part of a collection featuring a coloured and uncoloured quarter duo, the reverse depicts John McCrae sitting in a field of poppies as he composes the poem.
2016	75th anniversary of the Battle of the Atlantic	Yves Bérubé	5,000,000	Features a sailor aboard a Canadian warship who presses his eye to the viewfinder of his anti-aircraft gun, scanning the skies for threats. Two other Canadian vessels in the distance while a Bristol Beaufighter flies overhead.
2017	Dance of the Spirits	Timothy Hsia	10,000,000 (including coloured and regular issues)	Commemorating the 150th anniversary of the Confederation of Canada. The design shows a pair of paddlers dwarfed by a night sky alive with the ever-shifting movement of the aurora borealis. The aurora portion glows in the dark. The theme of the coin is "Our Wonders".
2017	100th anniversary of the Battle of Vimy Ridge	Tony Bianco	5,130,000	The coin design features the Canadian National Vimy Memorial in Vimy, France, flanked by a First World War soldier on the left and a veteran soldier on the right.
2018	100th anniversary of the Armistice of 11 November 1918	Laurie McGaw	2,000,000 (with applied colour); 1,000,000 (regular issue)	The coin design features two symbols of remembrance: a soldier's helmet represents the end of the First World War and serves as a reminder of the many lives lost during history's first mechanized war. Below the helmet lies a large poppy, the official bloom of remembrance, whose bright scarlet colour is re-created on the selectively coloured coins.
2019	75th anniversary of the Battle of Normandy	Alan Daniel	2,000,000 (with applied colour); 1,000,000 (regular issue)	The coin features Canadian soldiers en route to Juno Beach.
2020	100th anniversary of the birth of artist Bill Reid	Bill Reid	2,000,000 (with applied colour); 1,000,000 (regular issue)	The design features a rendering of the Xhuwaji, the Haida grizzly bear, along with his name and the year of issue placed between two micro-engraved maple leaves.
2020	75th anniversary of the end of the World War II	Thomas Shingles	2,000,000 (with applied colour); 1,000,000 (regular issue)	The design is based on the Victory nickel by Thomas Shingles, featuring a large "V" for Victory overlaid with a torch topped by orange and yellow flames. The Canadian victory emblem is flanked by maple leaves, while the double dates "1945" and "2020" appear at both left and right, to commemorate the 75th anniversary of the end of World War II. The words "Victory" (English) and "Victoire" (French) appear on the outer ring, with an inscription in International Morse code, that when translated reads "We win when we work willingly" (English) and "La bonne volonté est gage de victoire" (French). The words "Remember" (English) and "Souvenir" (French) are added to the bottom part of the outer ring.
2021	100th anniversary of the discovery of insulin	Jesse Koreck	2,000,000 (with applied colour); 1,000,000 (regular issue)	The design features a monomer, the building block of the insulin molecule, along with scientific instruments used in the early formulation of insulin, including a vial, mortar and pestle, and Erlenmeyer flask overlaid on a maple leaf, with red blood cells, glucose and insulin molecules, the words "insulin" and "insuline" appearing on the coin's outer ring and the dates "1921" and "2021" on the upper part of the coin's outer ring.
2022	50th anniversary of the Summit Series	Joel Kimmel	2,000,000 (with applied colour); 1,000,000 (regular issue)	The design features two hockey players representing Team Canada, with the team's stylized maple leaf emblem, with "the series" in English and French, and the words "50 years" and "ans" appearing on the coin.
2022	Honouring Queen Elizabeth II	Brent Townsend	4,305,025	Marking the end of Queen Elizabeth II's reign. With the same design as a regular toonie, except that the outer ring is coloured black, like a mourning band, instead of its usual silver. The colouring is achieved by using black nickel.
2023	National Indigenous Peoples Day	Megan Currie, Myrna Pokiak (Agnaviak) and Jennine Krauchi	2,000,000 (with applied colour); 1,000,000 (regular issue)	The design features three motifs representing Inuit, Métis and First Nations culture. Features the transitional effigy of the Queen, with the dates of her reign, and date of issue on the obverse.
2023	100th anniversary of the birth of Jean Paul Riopelle	Jean Paul Riopelle	2,000,000 (with applied colour); 1,000,000 (regular issue)	The coin features a recreation of Riopelle's L'Hommage à Rosa Luxemburg.
2024	100th anniversary of the Royal Canadian Air Force	Piu Yan Fong	2,000,000 (with applied colour); 1,000,000 (regular issue)	The coin features a CC-130H Hercules in the centre with the RCAF roundel above it, coloured on select coins. The outer rim features eight other RCAF aircraft: the Finch Mk. II, CSR-123 Otter, F-86 Sabre Mk. 6, CF-100 Canuck Mk. 5, CT-114 Tutor, CC-115 Buffalo, CF-188 Hornet, and CH-146 Griffon.
2024	Celebrate Inuit Nunangat	Tegan Voisey, Thomassie Mangiok, Charlotte Karetak, and Mary Okheena	2,000,000 (with applied colour); 1,000,000 (regular issue)	Designed by four Inuit artists, representing the four treaty areas of Inuit Nunangat: Nunatsiavut (ᓄᓇᑦᓯᐊᕗᑦ), Nunavik (ᓄᓇᕕᒃ), Nunavut (ᓄᓇᕗᑦ), and the Inuvialuit Settlement Region (ᐃᓄᕕᐊᓗᐃᑦ ᓄᓇᖓ). The centre core features Nuliajuk, spirit of the sea, alongside a walrus, narwhal, two beluga whales, a seal, and an Arctic char. The outer ring features four regionally-specific uluit (ᐅᓗᐃᑦ) on one side, and lettering "Inuit Nunangat" on the other. Between the maple leaf security features on the bottom of the coin is a pattern used in tradition of both Inuit tattooing and clothing.
2025	Celebrating the life and art of Daphne Odjig	Daphne Odjig	2,000,000 (with applied colour); 1,000,000 (regular issue)	Based on a 1977 painting Folk Singer by Daphne Odjig (1919–2016). The centre core features a cropped depiction of a woman holding a drum. The outer ring includes an engraved reproduction of a fisher, from her 1978 painting The Indian in Transition, where it appears as a visual representation of her surname.
2025	Honouring Canada's Unknown Soldier	Mary-Ann Liu	2,000,000 (with applied colour); 1,000,000 (regular issue)	The coin's core features the silhouettes of four soldiers saluting behind the Tomb of the Unknown Soldier. In front of the tomb is a poppy, which is colourized on select coins. The rim contains the lettering "Tomb of the Unknown Soldier" on the left, and "La tombe du soldat inconnu" on the right.
2026	50th anniversary of the CN Tower	Carl Wiens	2,000,000 (with applied colour); 1,000,000 (regular issue)	The reverse side of the coin celebrates Canada's tallest freestanding structure, showing the Toronto skyline defined by the CN Tower. This coin also features use of glow-in-the-dark printing techniques.

== Specimen set editions ==
From 2010 to 2015, the Royal Canadian Mint issued a two-dollar coin that depicts a different and unique image of a young animal on the coin's reverse. These special toonies have limited mintages and are available only in the six-coin specimen sets.

Year	Theme	Artist	Mintage	Full-set issue price
2010	Young lynx	Christie Paquet	15,000	$49.95
2011	Elk calf	Christie Paquet	15,000	$49.95
2012	Wolf cubs	Emily Damstra	15,000	$49.95
2013	Black bear cubs	Glen Loates	17,500	$49.95
2014	Baby rabbits	Pierre Leduc	17,500	$49.95
2015	Baby raccoons	Clinton Jammer	15,000	$49.95

== First strikes ==
Year	Theme	Mintage	Issue price
1996	Polar bear	2,375	$14.95
2006	10th anniversary toonie	5,000	$15.95
2006	New mint mark	5,000	$29.95

== Separation of metals ==
A failure in the bimetallic locking mechanism in the first batch of toonies caused some coins to separate if struck hard or frozen. Despite media reports of defective toonies, the RCM responded that the odds of a toonie falling apart were about one in 60 million. Deliberately attempting to separate a toonie is considered to be "defacing coin currency", a summary offence under section 456 of the Canadian Criminal Code.

== See also ==
- Newfoundland 2-dollar coin (antedating Canada's coin)
