= Royal Canadian Mint numismatic coins (1900–1999) =

One of the most profitable aspects of the Royal Canadian Mint (RCM) is its numismatic product line. The first numismatic coin from the RCM was arguably the 1935 dollar commemorating the Silver Jubilee of King George V. Though intended for circulation, it was the first Canadian coin commemorating an event. The decision to issue this coin was made in October 1934 by Prime Minister R. B. Bennett. There were economic and patriotic motivations for the release of a silver dollar, including a hope to boost the silver mining industry. In future years, the silver dollar would have a more emotional meaning for many Canadians because it was also the first coin to have the Voyageur motif on its reverse.

== Birth of luxury coins ==
Expansion in the numismatic line was a key element of the 1990s. The first significant sign was the creation of the two-hundred dollar gold coin. Starting in 1990, this coin was sold for a higher price than its face value. The first coin commemorated the Silver Jubilee of Canada's flag and sold for $395.00. The superstar of this collection would be the Canadian Native Cultures and Traditions coins. These coins were minted from 1997 to 2000. The Haida coin has been an award-winning coin for the RCM, taking the Best Coin Award at the 1997 Singapore International Coin Show.

The advent of the two-hundred dollar gold series was quickly joined by a platinum series. These high-quality collector coins solidified the RCM's entry into the luxury coin market. A four-coin set with face values of $30, $75, $150, and $300 respectively were complemented by the high-quality artwork that adorned these luxury items. Notable artists such as Robert Bateman and Glen Loates contributed to these collections with polar bear and bird designs. The issue price for these collections was around $1,990 and the casing was a walnut or burgundy (for 1994) case with a black suede four-hole insert and a certificate of authenticity.

== Numismatic fifty-cent collections ==
=== Discovering Nature series ===
Year	Theme	Artist	Finish	Issue price (4-coin set)	Total mintage	Designs
1995	Birds of Canada	Jean-Luc Grondin	Proof	$56.95	172,377	Atlantic Puffins, Whooping Crane, Gray Jays, and White Tailed Ptarmigans
1996	Little Wild Ones	Dwayne Harty	Proof	$59.95	206,552	Moose Calf, Wood Ducklings, Cougar Kittens, and Black Bear Cubs
1997	Canada's Best Friends	Arnold Nogy	Proof	$59.95	184,536	Newfoundland, Nova Scotia Duck Tolling Retriever, Labrador Retriever, Canadian Eskimo Dog
1998	Canada's Ocean Giants	Pierre Leduc	Proof	$59.95	133,310	Killer Whale, Humpback Whale, Beluga Whale, Blue Whale
1999	Cats of Canada	John Crosby	Proof	$59.95	83,423	Tonkinese, Lynx, Cymric, Cougar

=== 90th Anniversary of Royal Canadian Mint ===
Year	Theme	Artist	Issue price	Mintage
1998	Part of 90th Anniversary of Royal Canadian Mint set. Coins were matte finish.	Ago Aarand	$99.00	24,893
1998	Part of 90th Anniversary of Royal Canadian Mint set. Coins were matte finish.	Ago Aarand	$99.00	18,376

=== Canadian Sports series ===
Year	Coin no. 1	Coin no. 2	Coin no. 3	Coin no. 4	Artist	Finish	Issue price (4-coin set)	Total mintage
1998	First Amateur Figure Skating Championships 1888	First Cdn Ski Running and Jump Championships 1898	First Overseas Cdn Soccer Tour of 1888	Gilles Villeneuve, Grand Prix of Canada Victory, 1978	Friedrich G. Peter	Proof	$59.95	56,428
1999	First Cdn Open Golf Championship, 1904	First International Yacht Race, US vs. Canada, 1874	First Grey Cup, 1904	Invention of Basketball by James Naismith, 1891	Donald H. Curley	Proof	$59.95	52,115

== Commemorative Silver Dollar series ==
=== 1935–1980 ===
Year	Theme	Artist	Mintage	Issue price
1935	Voyageur Dollar	Emanuel Hahn	428,707	$1.00
1939	Royal Visit	Emanuel Hahn	1,363,816	$1.00
1949	Newfoundland Entry Into Confederation	Thomas Shingles	672,218	$1.00
1958	Totem Pole	Stephen Trenka	3,039,630	$1.00
1964	Confederation Meetings Commemorative	Dinko Vodanovic	7,296,832	$1.00
1967	Canadian Centennial	Alex Colville and Myron Cook	6,767,496	$1.00
1971	British Columbia Centennial	Patrick Brindley	585,217	$3.00
1973	RCMP Centennial	Paul Cedarberg	904,723	$3.00
1974	Winnipeg Centennial	Paul Pederson	628,183	$3.50
1975	Calgary Centennial	D. D. Paterson	833,095	$3.50
1976	Library of Parliament Centennial	Patrick Brindley and Walter Ott	483,722	$4.00
1977	Silver Jubilee of Elizabeth II	Raymond Lee	744,848	$4.25
1978	Commonwealth Games	Raymond Taylor	640,000	$4.50
1979	Griffon Tricentennial	Walter Schluep	688,671	$5.50
1980	Arctic Territories Centennial	D. D. Paterson	389,564	$22.00

=== 1981–1999 ===
1981 was the first year that the RCM issued two different qualities of silver dollars. One version was the Proof, which composed of a frosted relief against a parallel lined background. The second version was the Brilliant Uncirculated. The finish is classified as a brilliant relief on a brilliant background.

Year	Theme	Artist	Mintage (proof)	Issue Price (proof)	Mintage (BU)	Issue price (BU)
1981	Canadian Pacific Railway Centennial	Christopher Gorey	353,742	$18.00	148,647	$14.00
1982	Regina Centennial	Huntley Brown	577,959	$15.25	144,989	$10.95
1983	World University Games	Carola Tietz	340,068	$16.15	159,450	$10.95
1984	Toronto Sesquicentennial	D. J. Craig	571,079	$17.50	133,563	$11.40
1985	National Parks Centennial	Karel Rohlicek	537,297	$17.50	162,873	$12.00
1986	Vancouver Centennial	Elliott John Morrison	496,418	$18.00	124,574	$12.25
1987	John Davis 400th Anniversary	Christopher Gorey	405,688	$19.00	118,722	$14.00
1988	Saint-Maurice Ironworks	R.R. Carmichael	259,230	$20.00	106,702	$15.00
1989	Mackenzie River Bicentennial	John Mardon	272,319	$21.75	110,650	$16.25
1990	Henry Kelsey Tricentennial	D. J. Craig	222,983	$22.95	85,763	$16.75
1991	Frontenac	D. J. Craig	222,892	$22.95	82,642	$16.75
1992	Kingston to York Stagecoach	Karsten Smith	187,612	$23.95	78,160	17.50
1993	Stanley Cup Centennial	Stewart Sherwood	294,214	$23.95	88,150	$17.50
1994	RCMP Northern Dog Team	Ian D. Sparkes	178,485	$24.50	65,295	$17.95
1995	325th Anniv. Hudson's Bay Company	Vincent McIndoe	166,259	$24.50	61,819	$17.95
1996	John McIntosh, McIntosh Apple	Roger Hill	133,779	$29.95	58,834	$19.95
1997	25th Anniversary of Canada/Russia Summit Series	Walter Burden	184,965	$29.95	155,252	$19.95
1997	10th Anniversary of Loon Dollar	Jean-Luc Grondin	24,995	$49.95	No BU exists	N/A
1998	125th Anniversary of RCMP	Adeline Halvorson	130,795	$29.95	81,376	$19.95
1999	225th Anniversary of the Voyage of Juan Perez	D. J. Craig	126,435	$29.95	67,655	$19.95
1999	International Year of Older Persons	S. Armstrong-Hodgins	24,976	$49.95	No BU exists	N/A

== Definition of finishes ==
- Bullion

Brilliant relief against a parallel lined background

- Proof

Frosted relief against a mirror background

- Specimen

Brilliant relief on a satin background

== Mint marks ==
- A

Used on 2005 Palladium Test Coin to signify the coins were struck from Lot A.

- B

Used on 2005 Palladium Test Coin to signify the coins were struck from Lot B.

- C

Placed on sovereigns produced at the Ottawa branch of the Royal Mint, between 1908 and 1919.

- Dot

In December 1936, King Edward VIII abdicated the throne in favour of his brother, who would become King George VI. The problem was that the Royal Mint was designing the effigy of King Edward VIII and now a new effigy would need to be created. The 1-, 10- and 25-cent coins in 1937 would be struck from dies with a 1936 date on the reverse. To distinguish that these coins were issued in 1937, a dot mint mark was placed on the 1936 dies and could be found beneath the year. These coins fulfilled demand for coins until new coinage tools with the effigy of King George VI were ready. While the 10- and 25-cent coins are more common, the 1-cent coins are rare, with about a half-dozen known to exist.

- H

Used to identify coins that were struck for Canada by the Birmingham Mint, also known as the Heaton Mint, until 1907.

- Innukshuk

All circulation coins for the 2010 Vancouver Olympics have the Innukshuk mint mark on the Obverse of the coin.

- International Polar Year

The obverse of the 2007 International Polar Year $20 Numismatic Coin has the logo for the International Polar Year on the obverse of the coin.

- Maple Leaf

All coins with a Maple Leaf mint mark were struck in 1948 due to an emergency with coin toolage. The granting of India’s independence resulted in the removal of IND:IMP (meaning Emperor of India) from King George VI’s effigy. Due to the demand for circulation coins in 1948, coins for 1948 could not be struck until the new tools were received. The new tools would have the IND:IMP removed from them. In the meanwhile, coins were produced in 1948 with a year of 1947 on them. A small Maple Leaf mint mark was struck beside 1947 on the reverse of all coins to signify the year of production.

- P

From 2001-2006, most one cent, five cents, ten cents, twenty-five cents, and fifty cents issued for circulation were struck with a P mint mark to represent the Royal Canadian Mint’s plating process.

- Paralympic Logo

All circulation coins for the 2010 Vancouver Paralympic Games have the Paralympic Games logo on the Obverse of the coin.

- RCM Logo

At the CNA Convention in July 2006, the RCM unveiled its new mint mark to be used on all circulation and numismatic coinage. The agenda behind the implementation of this new mint mark was to help increase the RCM’s image as a brand. The aim of the logo is to educate coin users and coin collectors, respectively, that the RCM is minting Canada’s coins. The first Circulation Coin to have this new mint mark is the 10th Anniversary Two-Dollar coin. The first Numismatic Coin to have this new mint mark is the Snowbirds Coin and Stamp Set.

- T/É

In an effort to push the standard of quality higher, the RCM started to experiment with a gold bullion coin that would have a purity of 99.999%. The result was a Gold Maple Leaf Test Bullion coin with the mint mark of T/É (to signify Test/Épreuve). The date on the obverse of the coin was 2007 and it had a mintage of 500.

- Teddy Bear

When the RCM released its Baby Lullabies and CD Set, a sterling silver one dollar coin was included in the set. The one dollar coin included a mint mark of a teddy bear.

- W

Used occasionally on specimen sets produced in Winnipeg, starting in 1998.

- W/P

Used on the Special Edition Uncirculated Set of 2003. The W mint mark stated that the coin was produced in Winnipeg and the P states that the coins are plated.

== See also ==
- Canadian Silver Maple Leaf
- Royal Canadian Mint Olympic Coins
- Royal Canadian Mint numismatic coins (2000s)
