= Cultural depictions of George VI =

George VI is depicted in art and popular culture.

== Film, stage, television and radio ==
George has been portrayed by:

- Andrew Ray in the 1974 LWT adaptation of Royce Ryton's play Crown Matrimonial, and in the 1978 Thames Television mini-series Edward & Mrs. Simpson
- Lyndon Brook in the 1979 BBC TV drama Churchill and the Generals
- Owen Holder in the 1986 TV drama series Lord Mountbatten: The Last Viceroy
- James Wilby in the 2002 Carlton Television drama Bertie and Elizabeth
- Anthony Andrews in the 2003 BBC TV series Cambridge Spies
- Mick Rose in the 2004 TV drama Ike: Countdown to D-Day
- Harry Enfield in the 2004 spoof Churchill: The Hollywood Years
- Bill Champion in the 2005 film Wallis and Edward
- Iain Glen in the 2009 TV drama Into the Storm
- Alex Jennings in the 2009 radio play A King's Speech
- Colin Firth, winner of the Academy Award for Best Actor in the 2010 film The King's Speech. The film also won Best Picture at the 83rd Academy Awards.
- Laurence Fox in the 2011 film W.E.
- Charles Edwards in the 2012 West End stage adaptation of The King's Speech.
- Samuel West in the 2012 film Hyde Park on Hudson.
- Jonathan Townsend in a non-speaking cameo in the 2013 Christmas Special of Downton Abbey.
- Rupert Everett in the 2015 film A Royal Night Out.
- Jared Harris in the 2016 Netflix TV series The Crown.
- James Purefoy in the 2017 film Churchill.
- Jonathan Cullen in the 2017 BBC TV series SS-GB.
- Ben Mendelsohn in the 2017 film Darkest Hour.
- Jamie Hinde in the 2018 film 303 Squadron.

== Novels ==
George VI does not appear, but is prominently mentioned in Max Brooks' 2005 novel World War Z. When the living dead are threatening to overrun the British Isles and the rest of the world, Queen Elizabeth II refuses to flee from Windsor Castle in Berkshire, England to the strongholds established in Ireland or Scotland. When she is pleaded with to reconsider, Elizabeth says "The highest of distinctions is service to others," quoting her father, who said that to explain why he would not leave Britain for any safe zone, namely Canada, during World War II.

George is a significant character in Michael Dobbs' 2003 novel Winston's War, and Len Deighton's alternate history novel SS-GB, in which he is imprisoned during a Nazi occupation of Britain and killed during an escape attempt.

In the alternate history novel Fatherland by Robert Harris, George VI is deposed when Nazi Germany conquers the United Kingdom and the British Empire in the early 1940s. Most of the Royal Family are forced into exile in Canada, and George's elder brother Edward VIII is restored to the throne. After George's death in 1952, his eldest daughter Princess Elizabeth is recognised by the governments of Canada, Australia and the United States as the rightful British monarch.

In the alternate history novel The Man Who Prevented WW2 by Roy Carter, Edward VIII is assassinated by Jerome Bannigan on 18 July 1936. It is suspected that the Prime Minister Sir Oswald Mosley, who has come to power when the British Union of Fascists won a landslide victory in the 1935 election, is responsible for his murder. After his death, the BUF government abolishes the monarchy and places the Royal Family under house arrest in Balmoral Castle until they are expatriated to Switzerland in September 1939. Edward's younger brother and heir presumptive, Albert, Duke of York (who would have become George VI if the monarchy had not been abolished), is given the deed to the Royal Hotel in Geneva. His mother Queen Mary is disturbed that he has become an innkeeper and even more disturbed that she is an innkeeper's mother. However, the Duke later establishes a successful hotel chain.

== Comics ==
In Secret Origins #7 (November, 1986), George and Elizabeth are menaced by the Phantom of the Fair during their visit to New York in 1940. George fights with a robot minion of the Phantom to save his wife and himself, and is assisted by Sandman and the Crimson Avenger in the first battle between superheroes.

== Statues ==
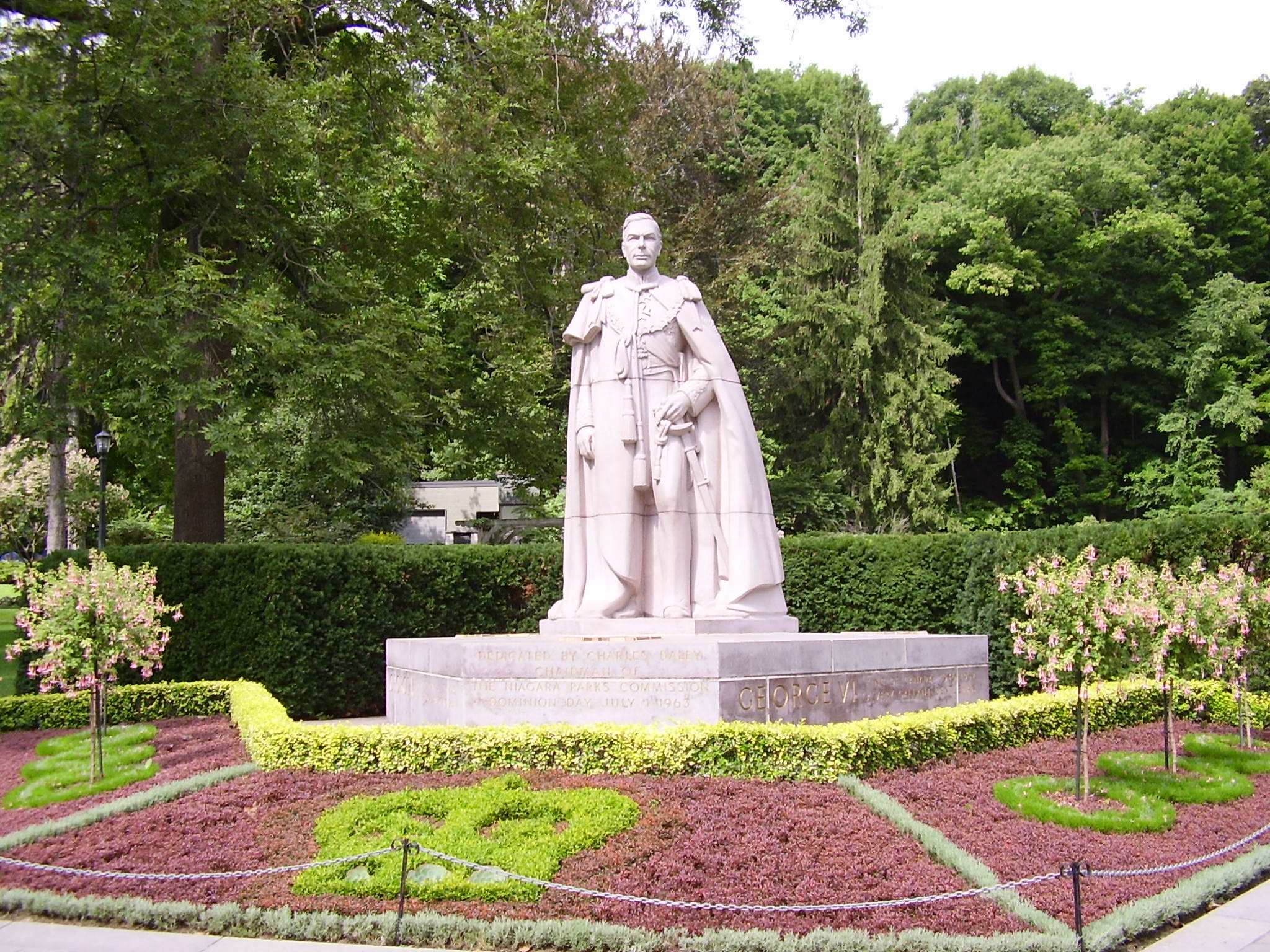
Statue of King George VI in Niagara Falls, Ontario.

In 1955, a statue of the king in naval uniform was erected just off The Mall and Carlton Gardens in London. A neighbouring statue of his wife was unveiled in 2009, creating the George VI and Queen Elizabeth Memorial. Other statues of the king include one in the Hong Kong Zoological and Botanical Gardens.

The Big Nickel is a 1964 roadside attraction statue in the shape of a 1951 Canadian nickel located at the Dynamic Earth science centre in Greater Sudbury, Ontario, Canada. The 1951 nickel depicts George VI on its obverse.
