= Loonie =

Canadian $1 coin

One dollar
- Canada
- Value: 1.00 Canadian dollar
- Mass: 6.27 g
- Diameter: 26.5 mm
- Thickness: 1.95 mm
- Edge: Eleven-sided, smooth, 7.5 mm
- Composition: Steel, brass plating
- Years of minting: 1987–present

Obverse
- Design: Charles III, King of Canada
- Designer: Steven Rosati
- Design date: 2023

Reverse
- Design: Common loon in water
- Designer: Robert-Ralph Carmichael
- Design date: 2012

In Canada, the loonie (French: huard), formally the one-dollar coin, is a gold-coloured Canadian coin introduced in 1987 that is worth one dollar. Its purpose was to replace the country's one-dollar bill. It is minted by the Royal Canadian Mint at its facility in Winnipeg. The most prevalent versions of the coin show a common loon, a bird found throughout most of Canada, on the reverse and Queen Elizabeth II, the nation's head of state at the time of the coin's issue, on the obverse. Various commemorative and specimen-set editions of the coin with special designs replacing the loon on the reverse have been minted over the years. Beginning in December 2023, a new version featuring King Charles III entered circulation.

The coin's outline is an 11-sided Reuleaux polygon. Its diameter of 26.5 mm (1.04 in) and its 11-sidedness match that of the already-circulating Susan B. Anthony dollar in the United States, and its thickness of 1.95 mm (0.077 in) is a close match to that coin's 2.0 mm (0.079 in) thickness. Its gold colour differs from the silver-coloured Anthony dollar; however, the succeeding Sacagawea and presidential dollars match the loonie's overall hue. Other coins using a non-circular curve of constant width include the 7-sided British twenty pence and fifty pence coins (the latter of which has similar size and value to the loonie but is silver in colour).

After its introduction, the coin became a metonym for the Canadian dollar: media often discuss the rate at which the loonie is trading against other currencies. The nickname loonie became so widely recognized that in 2006, the Royal Canadian Mint secured the rights to it. When the Canadian two-dollar coin was introduced in 1996, it was in turn nicknamed the "toonie" (a portmanteau of "two" and "loonie").

== Background ==
Canada first minted a silver dollar coin in 1935 to celebrate the 25th anniversary of George V's reign as king. The voyageur dollar, so named because it featured an Indigenous person and a French voyageur paddling a canoe on the reverse, was minted in silver until 1967, after which it was composed primarily of nickel. The coins did not see wide circulation, mainly due to their size and weight; the nickel version weighs 15.6 grams (0.55 oz) and is 32.1 millimetres (1.26 in) in diameter, and is itself smaller than the silver version. By 1978, Canadian businesses, namely vending machine operators, and transit authorities were advocating for a one-dollar coin that circulated more easily.

By 1982, the Royal Canadian Mint had begun work on a new composition for the dollar coin that it hoped would lead to increased circulation. At the same time, vending machine operators and transit systems were lobbying the Government of Canada to replace the dollar banknotes with more widely circulating coins. A Commons committee recommended in 1985 that the dollar bill be eliminated despite a lack of evidence that Canadians would support the move. The government argued that it would save between $175 million and $250 million over 20 years by switching from bills that had a lifespan of less than a year to coins that would last two decades.

== History ==
The government announced on March 25, 1986, that the new dollar coin would be launched the following year as a replacement for the dollar bill, which would be phased out. Two proposals for the coin were considered, one by Inco for the Nigold coin, and one by Sheritt Gordon Mines for an aureate bronze plated on pure nickel (aureate nickel) coin. The government selected the Sherritt Gordon Mines proposal as it was less costly and the innovative technology behind the coin could serve to demonstrate the Royal Canadian Mint's capabilities in the international coinage market.

It was expected to cost $31.8 million to produce the first 300 million coins but, through seigniorage (the difference between the cost of production and the coin's value), expected to make up to $40 million a year on the coins. From the proceeds, a total of $60 million over five years was dedicated toward funding the 1988 Winter Olympics in Calgary.

The failure of the Susan B. Anthony dollar coin in the United States had been considered and it was believed Americans refused to support the coin due to its similarity to their quarter coin and its lack of aesthetic appeal. In announcing the new Canadian dollar coin, the government stated it would be the same overall size as the Susan B. Anthony coin – slightly larger than a quarter – to allow for compatibility with American manufactured vending machines but would be eleven-sided and gold-coloured. The sample Canadian dollar was well received in test groups, with 80% of participants feeling its size, shape and colour made it more easily discernible from other coins.

It was planned that the coin would continue using the voyageur theme reverse designed by Emanuel Hahn and an obverse effigy of Queen Elizabeth II designed by Arnold Machine. However, the master dies that had been struck in Ottawa were lost in transit en route to the Mint's facility at Winnipeg. A Commons committee struck to investigate the loss discovered that the Mint had no documented procedures for transport of master dies and that it had shipped them via a local courier in a bid to save $43.50. It was also found to be the third time that the Mint had lost master dies within five years. An internal review by the Royal Canadian Mint argued that while a policy existed to ship the obverse and reverse dies separately, the new coin dies were packaged separately but were part of the same shipment. The Mint also disagreed with the Royal Canadian Mounted Police's contention that the dies were simply lost in transit, believing instead that they were stolen. The dies were never recovered.

Fearing the possibility of counterfeiting, the government approved a new design for the reverse, replacing the voyageur with a Robert-Ralph Carmichael design of a common loon floating in water. Carmichael's design had been submitted to the Royal Canadian Mint in 1978 and was chosen from the existing bank of designs maintained by the Mint. In particular, the choice of the loon motif fit well with the other existing wildlife depictions used with the five-and twenty-five cent coins. The Canadian Wildlife Federation provided strong approval of the design choice.

The coin was immediately nicknamed the loonie across English Canada and became known as a huard, French for 'loon', in Quebec. The loonie entered circulation on June 30, 1987, as 40 million coins were introduced into major cities across the country. Over 800 million loonies had been struck by the coin's 20th anniversary.

After a 21-month period in which the loonie and $1 note were produced concurrently with each other, the Bank of Canada ceased production of the dollar banknote. The final dollar bills were printed on June 30, 1989. Initial support for the coin was mixed, but withdrawing the banknote forced acceptance of the coin.

The loonie has subsequently gained iconic status within Canada, and is now regarded as a national symbol. The term "loonie" has since become synonymous with the Canadian dollar itself. The town of Echo Bay, Ontario, home of Robert-Ralph Carmichael, erected a large loonie monument in his honour in 1992 along the highway, similar to Sudbury's 'Big Nickel'.

A year after the death of Elizabeth II, a new loonie featuring the image of Charles III designed by Steven Rosati was revealed on November 14, 2023. A small number of the coins entered circulation in December 2023.

== Lucky loonie ==
The 2010 Olympic "lucky" loonie

Officials for the 2002 Salt Lake Winter Olympics invited the National Hockey League's ice making consultant, Dan Craig, to oversee the city's E Center arena, where the ice hockey tournament was being held. Craig invited a couple of members from the ice crew in his hometown of Edmonton to assist. One of them, Trent Evans, secretly placed a loonie at centre ice. He had originally placed a dime but added the loonie after the smaller coin quickly vanished as the ice surface was built up. He placed the coins after realizing there was no target at centre ice for referees to aim for when dropping the puck for a faceoff. A thin yellow dot was painted on the ice surface over the coins, though the loonie was faintly visible to those who knew to look for it.

Keeping the coin a secret, Evans told only a few people of its placement and swore them to secrecy. Among those told were the players of the men's and women's teams. Both Canadian teams went on to win gold medals. Several members of the women's team kissed the spot where the coin was buried following their victory. After the men won their final, the coin was dug up and given to Wayne Gretzky, the team's executive-director, who revealed the existence of the "lucky loonie" at a post-game press conference.

The lucky loonie quickly became a piece of Canadian lore. The original lucky loonie was donated to the Hockey Hall of Fame, and Canadians have subsequently hidden loonies at several international competitions, including the 2008 Olympic Games and the 2010 IIHF World Championships. Loonies were buried in the foundations of facilities built for the 2010 Winter Olympics in Vancouver.

Capitalizing on the tradition, the Royal Canadian Mint has released a commemorative edition "lucky loonie" for each Olympic Games since 2004.

== Composition ==
The weight of the coin was originally specified as 108 grains, equivalent to 6.998 grams. The coin's diameter is 26.5 millimetres (1.04 in).

When introduced, loonie coins were made of aureate, a bronze–electroplated nickel combination. Beginning in 2007, some loonie blanks also began to be produced with a cyanide-free brass plating process. In the second quarter of 2012, the composition switched to multi-ply brass-plated steel. As a result, the weight dropped from 7.00 to 6.27 grams. This resulted in the 2012 loonie not being accepted in some vending machines. The Toronto Parking Authority estimated that at about $345 per machine, it would cost about $1 million to upgrade almost 3,000 machines to accept the new coins. The Mint stated that multi-ply plated steel technology, already used in Canada's smaller coinage, produces an electromagnetic signature that is harder to counterfeit than that of regular alloy coins; also, using steel provides cost savings and avoids fluctuations in price or supply of nickel.

On April 10, 2012, the Royal Canadian Mint announced design changes to the loonie and toonie, which include new security features.

== Commemorative editions ==
Alongside the regular minting of the loonie with the standard image of the common loon on the coin's reverse, the Royal Canadian Mint has also released commemorative editions of the one-dollar coin for a variety of occasions. These coins have a circulation-grade finish and have been made available to the public in five-coin packs and in 25-coin rolls in addition to being released directly into circulation.

Commemorative editions of the Canadian $1 coin
Year	Theme	Artist	Mintage	Notes
1992	125th anniversary of Confederation	Rita Swanson	23,010,000	Showing children and the Parliament Building. The regular loon design was also minted that year bearing the double date "1867–1992".
1994	Remembrance design	RCM Staff	15,000,000	Image of the National War Memorial in Ottawa
1995	Peacekeeping Monument	J. K. Harman, Richard Henriquez, Gregory Henriquez, C. H. Oberlander, Susan Taylor	41,813,100 (see note)	Figure represents the total number of loonies minted in 1995, including commemorative Peacekeeping Monument loonies.
2004	Olympic lucky loonie	R.R. Carmichael	6,526,000	First lucky loonie. Released for the 2004 Summer Olympics held in Athens, Greece.
2005	Terry Fox	Stan Witten	12,909,000	Fox is the first Canadian citizen to be featured on a circulated Canadian coin. There are versions that exist without grass on the reverse of the coin.
2006	Olympic lucky loonie	Jean-Luc Grondin	10,495,000	Second lucky loonie. Released for the 2006 Winter Olympics held in Turin, Italy.
2008	Olympic lucky loonie	Jean-Luc Grondin	10,851,000	Third lucky loonie. Released for the 2008 Summer Olympics held in Beijing, China.
2009	Montreal Canadiens centennial	Susanna Blunt	10,000,000	The coin features the Montreal Canadiens' "CH" logo and is double-dated 1909–2009.
2010	Olympic lucky loonie	RCM Staff	10,250,000	Fourth lucky loonie. Released for the 2010 Winter Olympics held in Vancouver. Includes the 2010 Winter Olympics symbol ilanaaq, an inukshuk.
2010	Navy centennial	Bonnie Ross	7,000,000	Features a Halifax-class frigate below anchor, a 1910 naval serviceman and a modern-day female naval officer.
2010	Saskatchewan Roughriders centennial	Susanna Blunt	3,100,000	Features the Roughriders logo along with a stylized 100.
2011	Parks Canada centennial	Nolin BBDO Montreal	5,000,000	Features stylized land, air and aquatic fauna, varieties of flora, as well as a symbolic park building and the silhouette of a hiker framed by a snow-capped mountain range.
2012	Olympic lucky loonie	Emily Damstra	5,000,000	Fifth lucky loonie. Released for the 2012 Summer Olympics held in London, United Kingdom. Features a common loon with its wings spread, the Olympic rings, and a laser-etched maple leaf.
2012	100th Grey Cup	RCM Staff	5,000,000	Features the Grey Cup with "100th Grey Cup" in English and French.
2014	Olympic lucky loonie	Emily Damstra	4,033,000	Sixth lucky loonie. Released for the 2014 Winter Olympics held in Sochi, Russia. Features a common loon with its wings spread sitting on a lake, the Canadian Olympic team logo, and a laser-etched maple leaf. Same design as the 2012 version of the lucky loonie.
2016	Women's right to vote	Laurie McGaw	5,000,000	Features a woman casting a ballot with a girl to commemorate the 100th anniversary of women's suffrage in Canada.
2016	Olympic lucky loonie	Derek Wicks	5,000,000	Seventh lucky loonie. Released for the 2016 Summer Olympics held in Rio de Janeiro, Brazil. Shows the image of a common loon on the water, poised for take-off with an arched body and outstretched wings, with a stylized maple leaf in the background.
2017	Connecting a Nation	Wesley Klassen	10,000,000	Commemorating the 150th anniversary of the Confederation of Canada. The design features the railroad and landmarks such as the Lions Gate Bridge, a prairie grain elevator, the CN Tower, Quebec City's Château Frontenac Hotel and an East Coast lighthouse. The theme of the coin is "Our Achievements".
2017	Toronto Maple Leafs 100th anniversary	Steven Rosati	5,150,000	The design features the Leafs logo, the double date "1917–2017", two hockey sticks crossed under a Canadian maple leaf, and a hockey puck between the words "Canada dollar" written around the top of the coin.
2019	LGBT equality	Joe Average	3,000,000	50th anniversary of the 1969 decriminalization of homosexuality in Canada. Design features two overlapping human faces within a large circle, and the word "equality" in both French and English. The design was issued both as a regular $1 coin and as a limited-edition $10 collector's coin in full colour.
2020	75th anniversary of the signing of the Charter of the United Nations	Joel Kimmel	2,000,000 (colour); 1,000,000 (regular)	In a nod to the UN logo, a world map within an olive branch wreath is paired with a maple leaf to symbolize Canada's commitment to the UN and its values.
2021	125th anniversary of the Klondike Gold Rush	Jori van der Linde	2,000,000 (colour); 1,000,000 (regular)	The coin features a rendition of the gold discovery that set off the Klondike Gold Rush. Under the shining sun, Keish ("Skookum" Jim Mason), Shaaw Tlàa (Kate Carmack), Kàa Goox (Dawson Charlie), all of whom were of Lingít and Tagish descent, and George Carmack can be seen panning for gold at the edge of Gàh Dek (Rabbit Creek / Bonanza Creek). The pictorial symbol for Ëdhä Dädhëchą (Moosehide Slide) is highlighted in red and white on coloured coins; it appears on the opposite side of the creek and represents the Tr'ondëk Hwëch'in and their deep, abiding connection to the land.
2022	Celebrating Oscar Peterson	Valentine De Landro	2,000,000 (colour); 1,000,000 (regular)	The coin features Peterson seated at a piano, playing his civil rights anthem "Hymn to Freedom", while musical notes and chord symbols from that piece also appear in the design. Coloured coins feature a purple background as a nod to Peterson's favourite colour.
2022	175th anniversary of the birth of Alexander Graham Bell	Christopher Gorey	2,000,000 (colour); 1,000,000 (regular)	The coin features a reproduction of Bell's signature, paired with a portrait of the inventor. He is accompanied schematic illustrations of the Silver Dart—the aircraft that achieved the first controlled, powered flight in Canada—and the record-setting HD-4 hydrofoil; both crafts made history on Bras d'Or Lake, represented by the waves that are highlighted in blue on the colourized coin.
2023	Honouring Elsie MacGill	Claire Watson	2,000,000 (colour); 1,000,000 (regular)	Featured on the coin is Elsie MacGill, the word Canada at the top, the word dollar at the bottom, and a Hawker Hurricane in the sky which appears in colour on select coins. On the obverse is Queen Elizabeth II and the dates "1952–2022" in honour of her reign.
2024	150th anniversary of the birth of L. M. Montgomery	Brenda Jones	2,000,000 (colour); 1,000,000 (regular)	Portrait of Montgomery beside titular character Anne of Green Gables, an open portfolio, and an inkwell. The background of the coin features the landscape of Prince Edward Island, the setting of many of Montgomery's stories, which is coloured on select coins.
2025	150th anniversary of the Supreme Court of Canada	Silvia Pecota	2,000,000 (colour); 1,000,000 (regular)	The Supreme Court of Canada building, with the text "Supreme Court of Canada" and "Cour suprême du Canada" on the left and right respectively. In the centre, a navy blue emblem with white lettering "150" surrounded on the left by laurels. The emblem is also dated "1875 – 2025".
2026	2026 FIFA World Cup	Glen Green	2,000,000 (colour); 1,000,000 (regular)	A maple leaf mosaic, highlighted in shades of orange and red squares, an engraving of the 2026 FIFA World Cup emblem, a soccer ball in motion, and an engraving of the Canadian host cities of Toronto and Vancouver

== Terry Fox loonie ==
The Terry Fox Loonie was unveiled in 2005 and designed by Senior Engraver Stanley Witten. The coin depicts the Canadian athlete, humanitarian, and cancer research activist Terry Fox.

Following his design of the 2005 Terry Fox loonie, Witten told the Ottawa Citizen that "while sculpting the design, I wanted to capture Terry fighting the elements, running against the wind, towering over wind-bent trees on a lonely stretch of Canadian wilderness."

== Specimen set editions ==
In 1997, 2002, and each year since 2004, the Royal Canadian Mint has issued a one-dollar coin that depicts a different and unique image of native Canadian animals on the coin's reverse. These special loonies have limited mintages and are available only in the six-coin specimen sets.

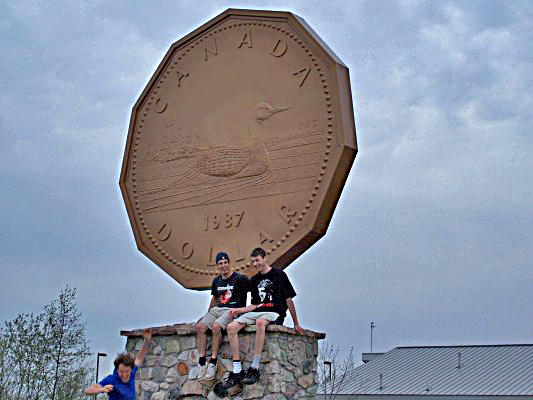
The Big Loonie in Echo Bay, Ontario

Year	Theme	Artist	Mintage
1997	10th anniversary of the loonie	Jean-Luc Grondin	97,595
2002	15th anniversary of the loonie	Dora de Pédery-Hunt	67,672
2004	Jack Miner Bird Sanctuary	Susan Taylor	46,493
2005	Tufted puffin	Mark Hobson	39,818
2006	Snowy owl	Glen Loates	39,935
2007	Trumpeter swan	Kerri Burnett	40,000
2008	Common eider	Mark Hobson	40,000
2009	Great blue heron	Chris Jordison	40,000
2010	Northern harrier	Arnold Nogy	35,000
2011	Great grey owl	Arnold Nogy	35,000
2012	25th anniversary of the loonie	Arnold Nogy	35,000
2013	Blue-winged teal	Glen Loates	50,000
2014	Ferruginous hawk	Trevor Tennant	50,000
2015	Blue jay	Brent Townsend	30,000
2016	Tundra swan	Glen Scrimshaw	30,000
2017	Snow goose	Pierre Girard	30,000
2018	Burrowing owl	Pierre Girard	30,000
2019	Pileated woodpecker	Jean-Charles Daumas	30,000
2020	Black-footed ferret	Caitlin Lindstrom-Milne	25,000
2021	Blanding's turtle	Pierre Girard	30,000
2022	Swift fox	Claude Thivierge	30,000
2023	Greater sage-grouse	David Caesar	30,000
2024	Northern leopard frog	Julius Csotonyi	30,000
2025	Monarch butterfly	Julius Csotonyi	30,000

== First strikes ==
Year	Theme	Mintage
2005	Common loon	1,944
2005	Terry Fox	19,949
2006	Lucky Loonie	20,010
2006	With new Mint mark	5,000
2023	King Charles III obverse	15,000
