= Dynamic Earth =

Dynamic Earth may refer to:

- Dynamic Earth (Edinburgh), a not-for-profit visitor attraction and science centre in Edinburgh, Scotland
- Dynamic Earth (Ontario), an interactive science museum in Greater Sudbury, Ontario, Canada
