= Canadian silver dollar =

Commemorative coin

The Canadian silver dollar (French: Dollar argent du Canada) was first issued by the Royal Canadian Mint in 1935 to commemorate the Silver Jubilee of King George V. The coin's reverse design was sculpted by Emanuel Hahn and portrays a voyageur and a person of Indigenous descent paddling a birch-bark canoe. The faint lines in the background represent the Northern Lights. The voyageur design was used on the dollar until 1986. It was then replaced with the 1987 Canadian 1-dollar coin (colloquially known as the "loonie"). 1967 marked the end of the silver dollar as a business strike, or a coin issued for circulation. After 1967, the dollar coin was made of nickel, except for non-circulating commemorative issues for the collector market, which continue to contain silver.

== Varieties ==
=== 1911 ===
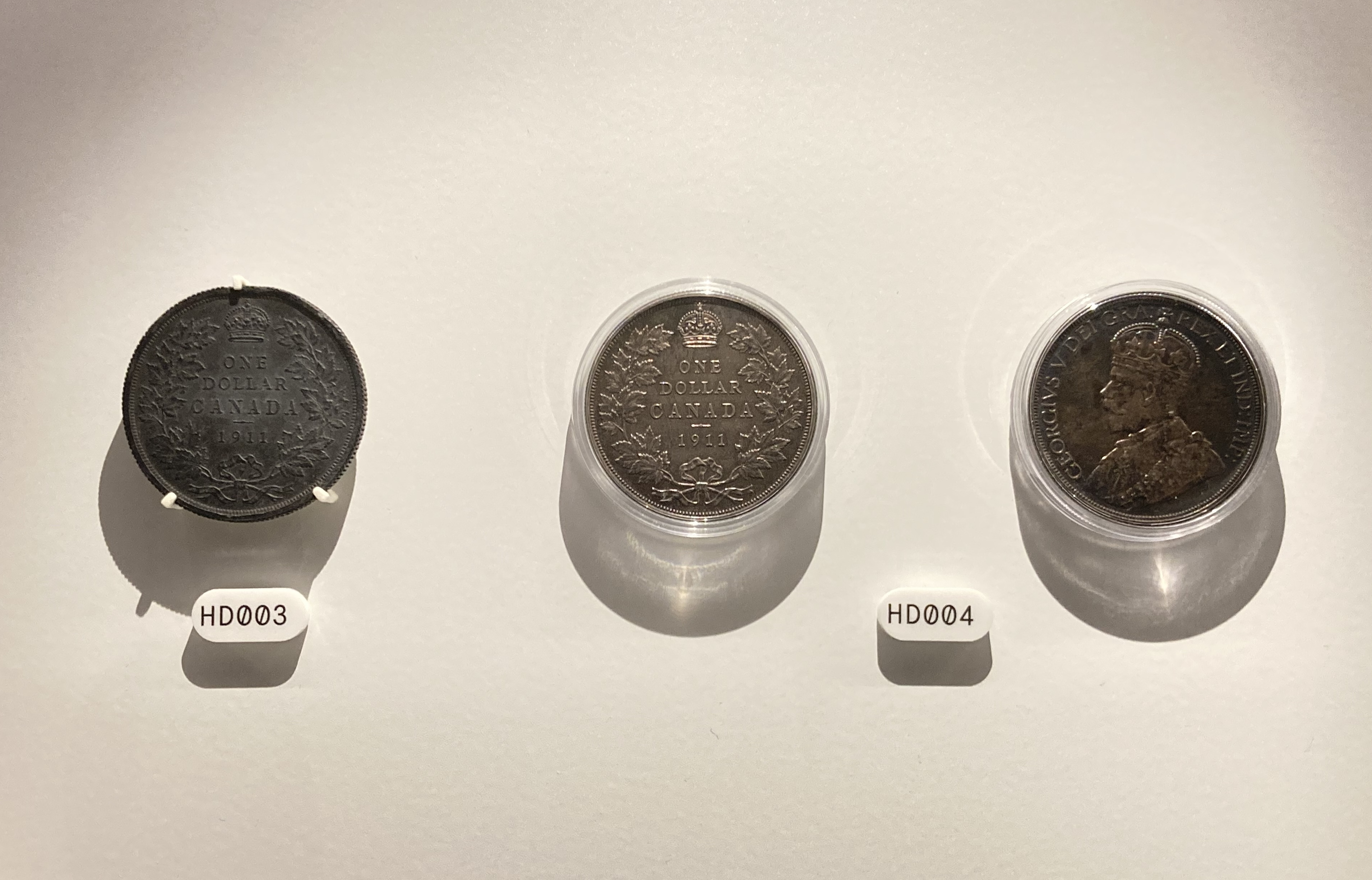
The three strikes of the 1911 silver dollar on display at the Bank of Canada Museum: the lead trial strike (left), the "Emperor of Canadian Coins" (centre) and the loan from the Royal Mint Museum (right).

While the silver dollar was not struck for production in 1911, three trial strikes were produced by the Royal Mint in London: two struck in silver and one in lead. Since these coins were unique and not intended for circulation, they have been classified as pattern coins. One of the silver coins, owned by the Royal Mint Museum, has been loaned to the Bank of Canada since 1976 and has been displayed in the Bank of Canada Museum since 1980. The lead coin was not discovered until 1977, during an office move from Parliament Hill. It was then promptly moved to the Bank of Canada's National Currency Collection with its silver counterpart.

The second 1911 silver dollar had belonged to William Ellison-Macartney, deputy mint master of the Royal Mint. After he died in 1924, the coin was passed on to his three children, before eventually being sold to Blair A. Seaby in 1960. He went on to display the coin to the public for the first time at a Canadian numismatic convention in Sherbrooke that same year, and at an American numismatic convention in Boston a week later. The coin was eventually sold in 1965 to John McKay-Clements, former mayor of Haileybury, Ontario. Following McKay-Clements' death in 1976, the coin was auctioned off again. Due to its uniqueness, it gained the nickname of the "Emperor of Canadian Coins" around the same time the 1911 half-dollar was dubbed the "King of Canadian Coins".

The coin changed hands several more times, being sold to Anthony Carrato of Eagle Coin Company for US$160,000 in July 1979, then Joseph Carlton and David Hirschman of Carlton Numismatics Inc. for US$325,000. Eventually, the coin made its way back to Canada after being auctioned off for US$690,000 to George H. Cook, a renowned Canadian collector, on January 13, 2003. After his death in 2018, Cook's collection was auctioned off during the American Numismatic Association World's Fair of Money in Chicago, where it was bought one final time by Sandy Campbell and Ian Laing for $734,000 after a 20% buyer's fee. They then offered the coin to the Bank of Canada Museum, citing that they want to make sure the coin stays in Canada's public cultural sphere. As part of the National Currency Collection, it rejoined its silver twin and lead counterpart for the first time in nearly 110 years since their mintage.

=== 1947 ===
Ten varieties of the 1947 Voyageur Dollar exist. The ten varieties can be placed into three distinct categories: the Pointed Seven, the Blunt Seven, and the Maple Leaf issue. The mintages for all of these are included on the mintage indicated on the chart below.

==== Pointed seven ====
Two styles of the number 7 in 1947 were used in the dies to produce the Voyageur coins. The seven was a tall figure with the lower tail pointing back to the right. On some of the coins, a dot appears near the 7. This is attributed to an imperfection in the die. Six different varieties of the Pointed 7 exist.

- Pointed 7
- Pointed 7 with a Double-Punched 4
- Pointed 7 with a dot near the 7
- Pointed 7 with a double punched HP under the effigy of His Majesty, King George VI
- Pointed 7 with a triple punched HP under the effigy of His Majesty, King George VI
- Pointed 7 with a quadruple punched HP under the effigy of His Majesty, King George VI (The HP is the initials of the designer: T.H. Paget)

==== Blunt seven ====
A shorter 7 with the lower tail pointing almost straight down has been labelled as the blunt seven.

- Blunt 7
- Blunt 7 with a double punched HP under the effigy of His Majesty, King George VI

==== Maple Leaf issue ====
In 1947, India gained its independence from the British Empire and as a result, the inscription "IND:IMP:" needed to be removed from the Obverse of the 1948 Silver Dollar. However, because there was a delay in new master dies being shipped from the UK to reflect this change, the Mint continued to produce 1947 year coins with a small Maple Leaf by the date to denote they were actually minted in 1948. Eventually the new Obverse dies did arrive, and they began to mint the 1948 dollars midway through the year. The very low mintages of these made the 1947 Maple Leaf and 1948 dollars exceptionally rare, with the 1948 Silver Dollar commanding a very high market price. (Mint condition 1948 coins are worth over CA$2,000 as of July 2019.)

- 1947 with the Maple Leaf near the 7
- 1947 with the Maple Leaf near the 7 with a double punched HP under the effigy of His Majesty King George VI

=== 1950–1952 ===
==== Arnprior type varieties ====
A technical problem emanated during the 1950s that was to plague the Royal Canadian Mint. At each end of the canoe on the Voyageur Dollar, are four shallow water lines. In the process of polishing the dies, parts of these lines tended to disappear. The result was that there were differences in the appearance of the coins from year to year. There were collectors that decided arbitrarily that a certain pattern of partial water lines at the right-hand end of the canoe should be collected separately and command a premium over dollars with perfect water lines or other partial lines configurations. The Arnprior type configurations tended to consist of 2 and ½ water lines at the right. Any trace of the bottom water line disqualified a coin from being considered an Arnprior type.

==== Varieties of 1952 ====
A modified reverse, with no water lines at all, was put into use in 1952. In addition to removing the water lines, this modified reverse was different because the image of the canoe on the coin had a larger islet tip at the right end. This variety is different from the Arnprior coins in that it was deliberately created.

==== Origin of the Arnprior name ====
In December 1955, the Royal Canadian Mint made up an order of 2,000 silver dollars for a firm in Arnprior, Ontario. These coins had 2 and ½ water lines at the right end of the canoe. This was similar to the accidental disappearance of water lines on the versions from 1950 to 1951. The 1955 dollars caught the interest of many collectors and it was this version that led to the term Arnprior being applied to any dollar with an appearance of missing water lines. An even more collectible of the 1955 Arnprior, is given by the die break on the obverse legend, with the result being the joining of the T and the I in GRATIA.

=== No shoulder fold obverse ===
An element that was common in every denomination of 1953 was the two obverses that existed. Said obverses are commonly identified as the No Shoulder Fold and the Shoulder Fold. The coinage for the year featured the new effigy of Queen Elizabeth II. The sculptor was Mary Gillick and she created a model with a relief that was too high. The centre portion of the effigy was to feature two lines on the shoulder. These lines were supposed to represent a fold in the Queen's gown. As these lines did not appear very well, it was commonly termed the No Shoulder Strap by many collectors. Later on in the year, the Royal Canadian Mint's Chief engraver Thomas Shingles lowered the relief of the model and strengthened the shoulder and hair details. This modified obverse became known as the Shoulder Strap variety.

=== 1957 Arnprior ===
The 1957 dollar had a reverse that was considered an Arnprior. The reverse featured one water line to the right of the canoe.

=== 1965 ===
Although 1965 would mark a change in the effigy of Queen Elizabeth II, the year would offer five different varieties of the dollar.

==== Variety 1 and 2 ====
The small beads on the obverse of the coin define varieties 1 and 2. The rear jewel on Queen Elizabeth II's tiara is well attached. The 5 in 1965 has two varieties. There is a pointed 5 (the point is at the bottom) while there is another version with a blunt 5 (the bluntness is at the bottom of the 5 too).

==== Variety 3 and 4 ====
The large beads on the obverse of the coin define varieties 3 and 4. The rear jewel on Queen Elizabeth II's tiara is well attached. The 5 in 1965 has two varieties. There is a pointed 5 (the point is at the bottom) while there is another version with a blunt 5 (the bluntness is at the bottom of the 5 too).

==== Variety 5 ====
The obverse of variety 5 features medium beads. Unlike the other varieties, the 5 in 1965 is pointed.

== 1982 planchet varieties ==
The 1982 nickel dollar exists on a rolled thin planchet. The normal planchet has a weight of 15.62 grams, a diameter of 32.13 mm, and a thickness of 2.5 mm. The thin planchet consists of incomplete reeding. Its weight is 7.78 grams, a diameter of 31.82 mm, and a thickness of 1.5 mm. It is believed that only two exist.

== History of composition ==
Voyageur

Years	Weight	Diameter/shape	Composition
1935–1967	23.33 g	36 mm	80% silver, 20% copper
1968–1986	15.62 g	32.13 mm	100% nickel

== Commemorative dollar specifications ==
Type	Years	Composition	Weight (grams)	Diameter	Thickness	Edge
Specimen nickel dollars	1968–1976, 1982, 1984	.999 Nickel	15.62 grams	32.13 mm	N/A	Reeded
Specimen/proof silver dollars	1971–1991	.500 silver, .500 copper	23.3 grams	36.07 mm	N/A	Reeded
Proof/nickel bronze dollars (see Loonie for history)	1987–present	Nickel Plated with Bronze	7 grams	26.5 mm	1.9 mm	11-sided plain
Proof silver dollars	1992–2002	.925 silver, .075 copper	25.175 grams	36.07 mm	2.95 mm	Reeded
Proof silver dollars	2003–2006	99.99% silver	25.175 grams	36.07 mm	3.02 mm	Reeded
Proof silver dollars	2007–2011	.925 silver, .075 copper	25.175 grams	36.07 mm	N/A	Reeded
Proof silver dollars	2012–present	99.99% silver	23.17 grams	35.9 mm	2.8 mm	Reeded

== Voyageur mintages and the 1911 silver dollar ==
=== Silver content, 1911, 1935–1967 ===
Year	Mintage
1911	3
1935	428,707
1936	306,100
1937	241,002
1938	90,304
1939	1,363,816
1945	38,391
1946	93,055
1947	65,595
1947ML	21,135
1948	18,780
1949	672,218
1950	261,002
1951	416,395
1952	406,148
1953	1,074,578
1954	246,606
1955	268,105
1956	209,092
1957	496,389
1958	3,039,564
1959	1,443,502
1960	1,420,486
1961	1,262,231
1962	1,884,789
1963	4,179,981
1964	7,296,832
1965	10,768,569
1966	9,912,178
1967	6,767,496

=== Nickel content, 1968–1986 ===
Year	Mintage
1968	5,579,714
1969	4,809,313
1972	2,193,000
1975	3,256,000
1976	2,101,000
1977	1,393,745
1978	2,948,488
1979	1,884,789
1980	2,544,000
1981	2,778,900
1982	1,544,398
1983	2,267,525
1984	1,223,486
1985	3,104,592
1986	3,089,225

== Commemorative nickel dollar ==
Year	Theme	Artist	Mintage
1970	Manitoba centennial	Raymond Taylor	4,140,058
1971	British Columbia centennial	Terry Manning, Thomas Shingles	4,260,781
1973	Prince Edward Island centennial	Terry Manning, Walter Ott	3,196,452
1974	Winnipeg centennial	Paul Pederson, Patrick Brindley	2,799,363
1982	Constitution commemorative	Ago Aarand	11,812,000
1984	Jacques Cartier's landing at Gaspé	Hector Greville, Victor Cote	6,141,503

== Commemorative silver dollar series ==
=== 1935–1980 ===
Year	Theme	Artist	Mintage	Issue price
1935	Voyageur dollar	Emanuel Hahn	428,707	$1
1939	1939 Royal visit	Emanuel Hahn	1,363,816	$1
1949	Newfoundland entry into Confederation	Thomas Shingles	672,218	$1
1958	Founding of the colony of British Columbia	Stephen Trenka	3,039,630	$1
1964	Confederation meetings commemorative	Dinko Vodanovic	7,296,832	$1
1967	Canadian centennial	Alex Colville and Myron Cook	6,767,496	$1
1971	British Columbia centennial	Patrick Brindley	585,217	$3
1973	RCMP centennial	Paul Cedarberg	904,723	$3
1974	City of Winnipeg centennial	Paul Pederson	628,183	$3.50
1975	City of Calgary centennial	D.D. Paterson	833,095	$3.50
1976	Library of Parliament centennial	Patrick Brindley and Walter Ott	483,722	$4
1977	Silver Jubilee of Elizabeth II	Raymond Lee	744,848	$4.25
1978	Commonwealth Games	Raymond Taylor	640,000	$4.50
1979	Griffon tricentennial	Walter Schluep	688,671	$5.50
1980	Arctic Territories centennial	D.D. Paterson	389,564	$22

=== 1981–1999 ===
Note: 1981 was the first year that the RCM issued two different qualities of silver dollars. One version was the Proof, which was composed of a frosted relief against a parallel lined background. The second version was the Brilliant Uncirculated. The finish is classified as a brilliant relief on a brilliant background.

Year	Theme	Artist	Mintage (proof)	Issue price (proof)	Mintage (BU)	Issue price (BU)
1981	Canadian Pacific Railway centennial	Christopher Gorey	353,742	$18	148,647	$14
1982	Regina centennial	Huntley Brown	577,959	$15.25	144,989	$10.95
1983	World University Games	Carola Tietz	340,068	$16.15	159,450	$10.95
1984	Toronto sesquicentennial	D.J. Craig	571,079	$17.50	133,563	$11.40
1985	National Parks centennial	Karel Rohlicek	537,297	$17.50	162,873	$12
1986	Vancouver centennial	Elliott John Morrison	496,418	$18	124,574	$12.25
1987	John Davis 400th anniversary	Christopher Gorey	405,688	$19	118,722	$14
1988	Saint-Maurice Ironworks	R.R. Carmichael	259,230	$20	106,702	$15
1989	Mackenzie River bicentennial	John Mardon	272,319	$21.75	110,650	$16.25
1990	Henry Kelsey tricentennial	D.J. Craig	222,983	$22.95	85,763	$16.75
1991	Frontenac	D.J. Craig	222,892	$22.95	82,642	$16.75
1992	Kingston to York stagecoach	Karsten Smith	187,612	$23.95	78,160	$17.50
1993	Stanley Cup centennial	Stewart Sherwood	294,214	$23.95	88,150	$17.50
1994	RCMP Northern Dog Team	Ian D. Sparkes	178,485	$24.50	65,295	$17.95
1995	325th anniversary of the Hudson's Bay Company	Vincent McIndoe	166,259	$24.50	61,819	$17.95
1996	John McIntosh, McIntosh apple	Roger Hill	133,779	$29.95	58,834	$19.95
1997	25th anniversary of Canada/Russia Summit Series	Walter Burden	184,965	$29.95	155,252	$19.95
1997	10th anniversary of the Loonie	Jean-Luc Grondin	24,995	$49.95	No BU Exists	N/A
1998	125th anniversary of RCMP	Adeline Halvorson	130,795	$29.95	81,376	$19.95
1999	225th anniversary of the voyage of Juan Perez	D.J. Craig	126,435	$29.95	67,655	$19.95

=== 2000–2016 ===
Year	Theme	Artist	Mintage (proof)	Issue price (proof)	Mintage (BU)	Issue price (BU)
2000	Voyage of Discovery	D.F. Warkentin	121,575	$29.95	62,975	$19.95
2001	50th anniversary of the National Ballet of Canada	Dora de Pédery-Hunt	89,390	$30.95	53,668	$20.95
2001	90th anniversary of the striking of Canada's 1911 silver dollar	W.H.J. Blakemore	24,996	$49.95	No BU Exists	N/A
2002	Golden Jubilee of Elizabeth II	Royal Canadian Mint Staff	29,688	$33.95	64,410	$24.95
2003	Discovery of cobalt	John Mardon	88,536	$36.95	51,130	$28.95
2004	400th anniversary of the first French settlement in North America	R.R. Carmichael	81,335	$36.95	41,934	$28.95
2005	40th anniversary of the flag of Canada	William Woodruff	N/A	$34.95	N/A	$24.95
2006	Victoria Cross	Royal Canadian Mint Staff	N/A	$34.95	N/A	$26.95
2007	Thayendanegea Joseph Brant	RCM Staff based on image by Laurie McGaw	35,000	$42.95	65,000	$34.95
2008	Quebec City 400th anniversary & 1st French settlement in North America	Suzanne Duranceau	35,000	$42.95	65,000	$34.95
2009	100th anniversary of flight in Canada.	Jason Bouwman	50,000	$47.95	50,000	$39.95
2010	100th anniversary of the Royal Canadian Navy	Yves Bérubé	50,000	$52.95	50,000	$46.95
2011	100th anniversary of Parks Canada	Luc Normandson	40,000	$55.95	25,000	$40.95
2012	200th anniversary of the War of 1812	Ardell Bourgeois	40,000	$59.95	25,000	$54.95
2013	100th anniversary of the Canadian Arctic Expedition	Bonnie Ross	40,000	$59.95	20,000	$54.95
2014	100th anniversary of the declaration of the First World War	Bonnie Ross	40,000	$59.99	20,000	$54.95
2015	50th anniversary of the Canadian flag	John Mantha	20,000	$59.95	15,000	$54.95
2016	150th anniversary of the trans-Atlantic cable	Yves Bérubé	20,000	$59.99	No BU ?	N/A ?

=== Special edition proof silver dollars ===
Year	Theme	Artist	Mintage	Issue price
1999	International Year of Older Persons	S. Armstrong-Hodgins	24,976	$49.95
2002	The Queen Mother	Royal Canadian Mint Staff	9,994	$49.95
2003	50th anniversary of the coronation of Queen Elizabeth II (first Effigy of Queen)	Emanuel Hahn	21,400	N/A
2003	50th anniversary of the coronation of Queen Elizabeth II (fourth Effigy of Queen)	Emanuel Hahn	29,586	$51.95
2004	400th anniversary of the first French settlement in North America (privy marked; part of coin and stamp set)	R.R. Carmichael	8,315	$99.95
2004	Remembrance poppy	Cosme Saffioti	24,527	$49.95
2006	Medal of Bravery	Royal Canadian Mint Staff	N/A	$54.95
2007	Celebration of the arts	Friedrich Peter	20,000	$54.95
2008	100th anniversary of the Royal Canadian Mint	Jason Bouwman	25,000	$59.95
2009	100th anniversary of the Montreal Canadiens	Jason Bouwman	15,000	$69.95
2010	75th anniversary of Canada's Voyageur silver dollar	Percy Metcalf	7,500	$69.95
2011	100th anniversary of the striking of Canada's 1911 silver dollar	W.H.J. Blakemore	15,000	$64.95
2012	100th anniversary of the Grey Cup	Filip Mroz of Bensimon Byrne	10,000	$69.99
2012	100th anniversary of the first Calgary Stampede	Steve Hepburn	10,000	$69.95
2013	250th anniversary of the end of the Seven Years' War	Tony Bianco	10,000	$69.95
2013	60th anniversary of the end of the Korean War	Edward Carter Preston	10,000	$69.95
2014	75th anniversary of the declaration of the Second World War	Silvia Pecota	7,500	$69.99
2015	100th anniversary of the poem "In Flanders Fields"	Tony Bianco	10,000	$79.99
