= Robert-Ralph Carmichael =

Canadian artist (1937–2016)

Robert-Ralph Carmichael (1937 – July 16, 2016) was a Canadian artist who designed the image of the common loon on the reverse side of the Canadian one-dollar coin. The coin takes its name, loonie (huard in French), from the image of the bird on the reverse. The artwork depicts a loon swimming in a lake, with coniferous trees visible on a point of land on the horizon. Carmichael's initials, RRC, are visible directly under the loon's beak, between the ripples on the surface of the water.

Robert-Ralph lived near the northern town of Echo Bay, Ontario in the scenic Sylvan Valley. Since 1992, the town has honoured Carmichael with a monument in the shape of the coin located along the highway. The monument is called the "Big Loonie" in reference to nearby Sudbury's "Big Nickel" monument.

Carmichael's artwork is part of a number of collections, including that of the Government of Ontario in Queen's Park, Toronto, the Canada Council Art Bank in Ottawa, and the Art Gallery of Algoma in Sault Ste. Marie in the artist's home province of Ontario. In Alberta, his work is in the collections of the University of Calgary and the Alberta Arts Foundation in Edmonton. A collection of Carmichael's work can be viewed at Roses Art Gallery in Sault Ste. Marie.
