= Hieu C. Truong =

Vietnamese engineer

Hieu Cong Truong, OC (born September 23, 1941) is a Vietnamese Canadian engineer, responsible for designing minting machines used by the Royal Canadian Mint. His engineering team was responsible for creating the two dollar coin's bi-metallic coin locking mechanism.

== Early life and education ==
Born in Saigon, Vietnam, Truong graduated from New York University in 1963 studying chemical engineering. After earning his master's degree in chemical engineering in 1964, he returned to Vietnam where he was a lecturer at Phu Tho National Technical Center eventually becoming director of its chemical engineering school. After completing his Ph.D. in engineering in 1971 from New York University, he emigrated to Canada.

== Career ==
Truong joined the Royal Canadian Mint in 1978 until retiring in 2014. He is the namesake of the Mint's Hieu C. Truong Centre of Excellence for Research and Development. His appointment to the Order of Canada was announced in June 2017.
