= Arnold Nogy =

Canadian artist

Arnold Nogy is a Canadian nature, animal, and wildlife artist. He is also known for his creation of a significant number of designs for Canadian coinage.

== Numismatic commissions ==
Nogy has had several commissions granted by the Royal Canadian Mint. As of 2013, nineteen coin designs have been accepted, including:.

- 1997, a series of four sterling silver 50 cent coins depicting four Canadian dog breeds. Canada's Best Friends was released in May 1997 and specialty watches were released that also bore the breeds' images.
- 2006, The Dog Sled Team, of which two coins were produced; a collector edition, a sterling silver 30 dollar coin with coloured image and, a gold coin of 250 dollar denomination.
- 2007-08, a series of three coloured collector coins depicting Canadian birds. These were produced by the Royal Canadian Mint partnered with the Canadian Wildlife Federation and Environment Canada. The first coin in the series featured the ruby-throated hummingbird, the second a red-breasted nuthatch and the third was the downy woodpecker.

== Awards ==
- Society of Animal Artists: Activities Press Print Award, 1995 for "Narrow Escape", a snowy owl.

== See also ==
- Royal Canadian Mint numismatic coins
- Royal Canadian Mint numismatic coins (2000s)
- List of Canadian artists
