= 1945 Canadian victory nickel =

Canadian coin produced between 1943 and 1945

The Victory Nickel is a Canadian coin produced between 1943 and 1945. The design of the coin was intended to promote the Canadian war effort during World War II.

The coin was designed by Thomas Shingles, Master Engraver of the Royal Canadian Mint. The rim of the reverse side of the coin bears the message "We Win When We Work Willingly" in Morse code.

== 2005 Victory Anniversary Nickel ==
A similar coin was released in 2005 to mark the 60th anniversary of the end of World War II.
