= Macdonald, Meredith and Aberdeen Additional =

- Township (single-tier)
- Township of Macdonald, Meredith and Aberdeen Additional
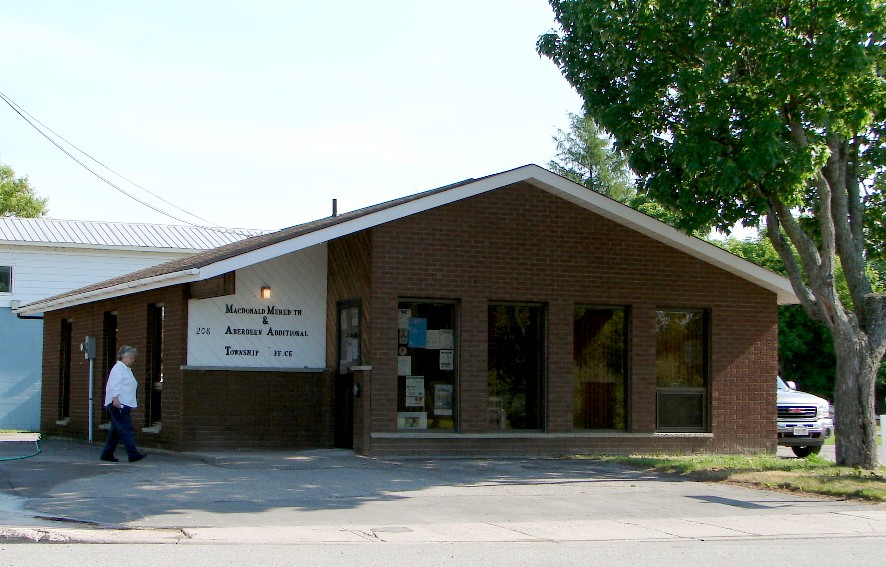
- Municipal office in Echo Bay

- Location within Ontario
- Coordinates: 46°29′N 84°04′W
- Country: Canada
- Province: Ontario
- District: Algoma
- Settled: mid 19th century
- Incorporated: 1899

Government
  - Type: Township
  - Mayor: Lynn Watson
  - MP: Terry Sheehan (Liberal)
  - MPP: Bill Rosenberg (PC)

Area
  - Land: 163.26 km^{2} (63.04 sq mi)

Population (2021)
  - Total: 1,513
  - Density: 9.3/km^{2} (24/sq mi)
- Time zone: UTC-5 (EST)
  - Summer (DST): UTC-4 (EDT)
- Postal Code: P0S 1C0
- Area codes: 705, 249
- Website: echobay.ca

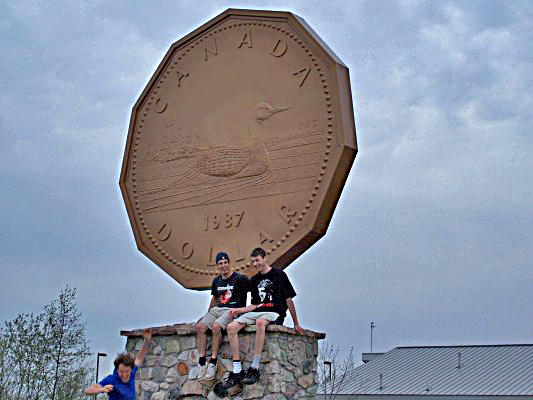
The Big Loonie in Echo Bay.

Macdonald, Meredith and Aberdeen Additional is a township in Algoma District, Ontario, Canada. Originally surveyed as separate geographical townships, Macdonald and Meredith were incorporated as a single, municipal township in 1892. The geographical township of Aberdeen Additional was added to Macdonald and Meredith township in 1899 to create the municipal township of Macdonald, Meredith and Aberdeen Additional.

Macdonald township was named after John A. Macdonald, while Meredith township was named after William Ralph Meredith.

== Communities ==
The township encompasses the unincorporated communities of Echo Bay (46°29′08″N 84°04′02″W), Echo River (46°30′35″N 84°02′15″W), and Sylvan Valley (46°28′15″N 83°59′22″W).

Echo Bay, the township's main population centre, is located on the shores of the eponymous Echo Bay and Lake George. The community is home to a big loonie, similar to the Big Nickel in Sudbury, around 260 kilometres (160 mi) eastward. Robert-Ralph Carmichael, one of the Canadian dollar coin's designers, lived near Echo Bay.

Bar River (46°26′30″N 84°01′34″W) is a small hamlet straddling the boundary between the townships of Macdonald, Meredith and Aberdeen Additional and Laird.

== Demographics ==
In the 2021 Census of Population conducted by Statistics Canada, Macdonald, Meredith and Aberdeen Additional had a population of 1,513 living in 603 of its 803 total private dwellings, a change of −6% from its 2016 population of 1,609. With a land area of 163.26 km^{2} (63.04 sq mi), it had a population density of 9.3/km^{2} (24.0/sq mi) in 2021.

Canada census – Macdonald, Meredith and Aberdeen Additional community profile

	2021	2016	2011
Population	1,513 (−6.0% from 2016)	1,609 (9.9% from 2011)	1,464 (−5.5% from 2006)
Land area	163.26 km^{2} (63.04 sq mi)	164.05 km^{2} (63.34 sq mi)	163.52 km^{2} (63.14 sq mi)
Population density	9.3/km^{2} (24/sq mi)	9.8/km^{2} (25/sq mi)	9.0/km^{2} (23/sq mi)
Median age	45.6 (M: 44.8, F: 46.0)	45.3 (M: 43.0, F: 46.2)
Private dwellings	803 (total) 603 (occupied)	860 (total)	797 (total)
Median household income	$97,000	$74,496

References: 2021 2016 2011

Historical census populations – Macdonald, Meredith and Aberdeen Additional

Year	Pop.	±%
1901	953	—
1911	945	−0.8%
1921	1,061	+12.3%
1931	993	−6.4%
1941	1,084	+9.2%
1951	1,014	−6.5%
1956	1,120	+10.5%

Year	Pop.	±%
1961	1,200	+7.1%
1966	1,267	+5.6%
1971	1,305	+3.0%
1976	1,432	+9.7%
1981	1,514	+5.7%
1986	1,462	−3.4%
1991	1,548	+5.9%

Year	Pop.	±%
1996	1,521	−1.7%
2001	1,452	−4.5%
2006	1,550	+6.7%
2011	1,464	−5.5%
2016	1,609	+9.9%
2021	1,513	−6.0%

Source: Statistics Canada

== See also ==
- List of townships in Ontario
- Campbellford: Location for a Giant Toonie Monument, similar to the Big Loonie.
- Big Nickel: Located in Sudbury, Ontario.
