= Brent Townsend =

Canadian nature artist

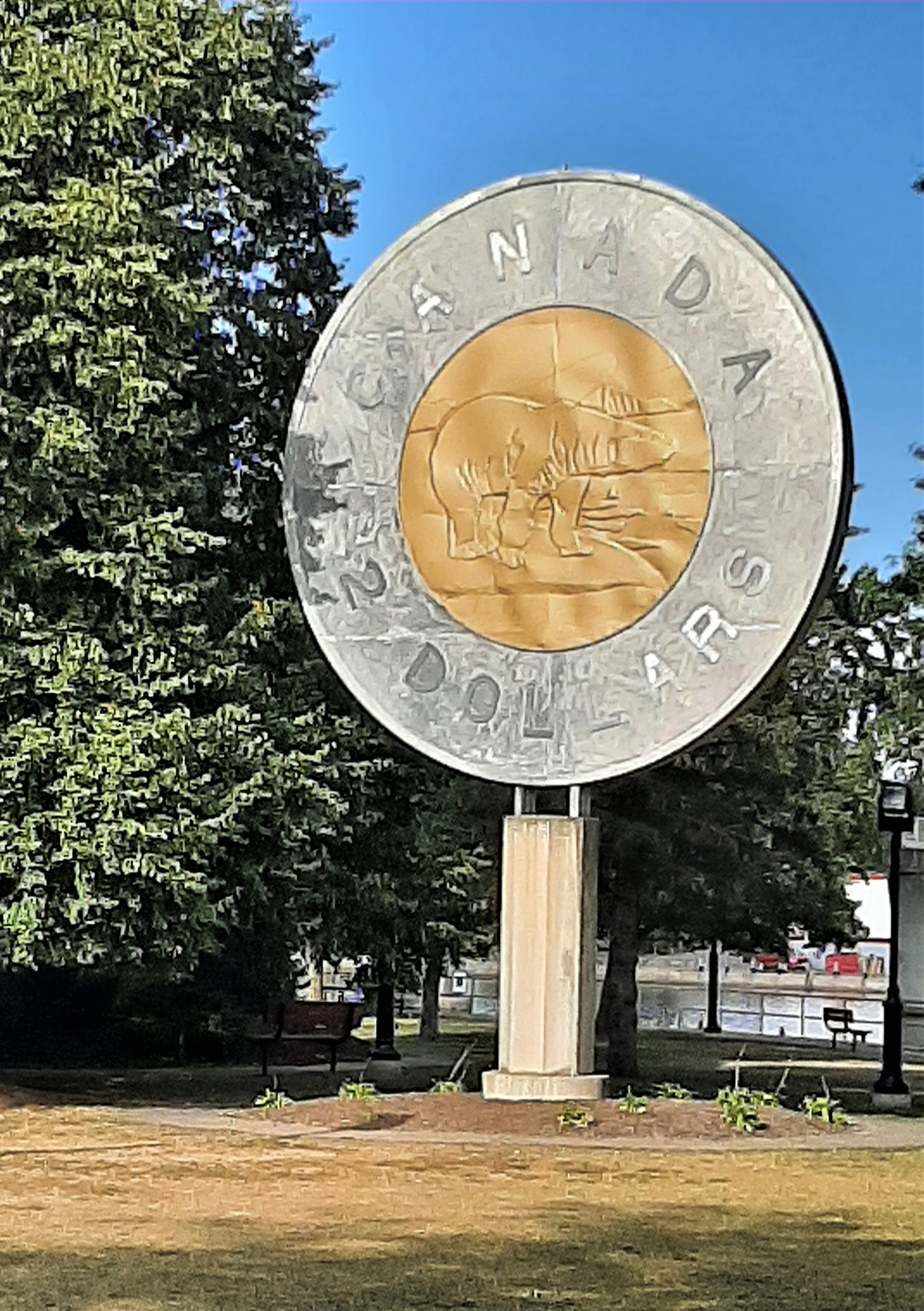
The Reverse Side of the Giant Canadian two-dollar coin (Toonie) Monument-Campbellford-Ontario

Brent Townsend is a Canadian nature artist who in 1996 designed the portrait of a polar bear in early summer on an ice floe that appears on the current Canadian 2 dollar coin. Born in Toronto, Townsend no longer lives in Campbellford, Ontario.
