= Royal Canadian Mint numismatic coins (2000–2019) =

From 2000 to 2019, there were various technological achievements in Canadian coin minting. The first RCM gold coin to be directly laser etched was the $100 Gold Leduc Oil Fields coin from 2002. The technique would later be used for the 2003 $100 Gold Marquis Wheat coin and the 2004 $20 Iceberg coin. In 2001, the RCM achieved innovation with the 2001 Marconi $5 silver coin. It was the first RCM coin to include a direct lasered finish. One of the technological breakthroughs for the RCM involved the 2006 Canadian Achievement series silver coin featuring Colonel Chris Hadfield. It was the first Canadian coin to be completely sculpted using computer software.

The Northern Lights $20 silver coin was the first RCM hologram coin to feature a hologram without a raised border and, therefore, no delineation. The hologram merges with the engraved relief of the mountains. In 2006, the $30 Canadarm coin was the first Canadian coin to be completely sculpted using computer software. Technically, it was a complex design to render, due to the depiction of the closed glass visor and the complicated features of the Canadarm.

== Numismatic three cents ==
Three cents

Year	Theme	Artist	Mintage	Issue Price
2001	Sesquicentennial of Canada's First Postage Stamp	Based on an image by Sir Sanford Fleming	59,573	$39.95

== Numismatic fifty-cent collections ==
Year	Theme	Mintage	Issue Price	Finish	Notes
2007	Annual Report	10,000	$25.95	Gold Plated	
2007	Christmas Ornaments	50,000	$25.95	Specimen with motion filled 3-D effect	
2008	Triangle Coin – Milk Delivery	25,000	$49.95	Green enamel effect on reverse, Proof Finish	Part of Irregular Shaped coins collection
2008	100th Anniversary of Royal Canadian Mint	16,000	$44.95	Sold as part of Coin and Stamp Set (double dated 1908–2008)	
2009	Calgary Flames	N/A		24.95	From Coin and Puck Set
2009	Edmonton Oilers	N/A		24.95	From Coin and Puck Set
2009	Montreal Canadiens	N/A		24.95	From Coin and Puck Set
2009	Ottawa Senators	N/A		24.95	From Coin and Puck Set
2009	Toronto Maple Leafs	N/A		24.95	From Coin and Puck Set
2009	Vancouver Canucks	N/A		24.95	From Coin and Puck Set
2009	Six String Nation Guitar	30,000	$34.95	Specimen, with hologram on reverse	Part of Irregular Shaped coins collection

=== Discovering Nature series ===
- Started in 1995

Year	Theme	Artist	Finish	Issue Price (For Four Coin Set)	Total Mintage	Designs
2000	Canada's Birds of Prey	Jean-Luc Grandin and Pierre Leduc	Proof	$59.95	123,628	Bald eagle, osprey, great horned owl, red-tailed hawk

=== Canadian Sports series ===
- Started in 1998

Year	Coin No 1	Coin No 2	Coin No 3	Coin No 4	Artist	Finish	Issue Price (For Four Coin Set)	Total Mintage
2000	First Recorded Hockey Game, 1875	Introduction of Curling to North America, 1760	First Steeplechase Race, 1840	Birth of the 5-Pin Bowling League, 1910	Brian Hughes	Proof	$59.95	50,091

=== Canadian Festivals series ===
Year	Coin No 1	Coin No 2	Coin No 3	Coin No 4	Coin No 5	Artist	Finish	Issue Price for each coin	Total Mintage
2001	Québec Winter Carnival	Toonik Tyme (Nunavut)	Folk Festival (Newfoundland)	Festival of Fathers (PEI)	N/A	Sylvie Daigneault, John Mardon, David Craig, Brenda Whiteway	Proof	$21.95	58,123
2002	Annapolis Valley Blossom (Nova Scotia)	Stratford Festival (Ontario)	Folkarama (Manitoba)	Calgary Stampede, (Alberta)	Squamish Days, (BC)	Sylvie Daigneault, John Mardon, David Craig, Michelle Grant, Brenda Whiteway	Proof	$21.95	61,900
2003	Yukon Festival	Back to Batoche (Manitoba)	Great Northern Arts Festival (Inuvik)	Festival Acadien de Caraquet (New Brunswick)	N/A	Ken Anderson, David Hannan, Dawn Oman, Hudson Design Group	Proof	$21.95	26,451

=== Canadian Folklore and Legends series ===
Year	Coin No 1	Coin No 2	Coin No 3	Artist	Finish	Issue Price for each coin	Total Mintage
2001	The Sled	The Maiden's Cave	Les Petits Sauteux	Valentina Holtz-Entin, Peter Kiss, Miyuki Tanobe	Proof	$24.95	28,979
2002	The Pig That Wouldn't Get Over The Stile	Shoemaker in Heaven	Le Vaisseau Fantome	Laura Jolicoeur, Francine Gravel, Colette Boivin	Proof	$24.95	19,789

=== Canadian Floral collection ===
Year	Theme	Artist	Finish	Issue Price	Total Mintage
2002	Golden Tulip	Anthony Testa	Proof (selectively gold plated)	$24.95	19,986
2003	Golden Daffodil	Christie Paquet	Proof (selectively gold plated)	$34.95	36,293
2004	Golden Easter Lily	Christie Paquet	Proof (selectively gold plated)	$34.95	23,486
2005	Golden rose	Christie Paquet	Proof (selectively gold plated)	$34.95	23,000
2006	Golden Daisy	Christie Paquet	Proof (selectively gold plated)	$34.95	23,000
2007	Golden Forget-Me-Not	Christie Paquet	Proof (selectively gold plated)	$38.95	20,000

=== Coat of Arms of Canada ===
Year	Theme	Finish	Issue Price	Total Mintage
2004	Evolution of Queen's Effigy	Proof	$79.95	11,707

=== 1/25-ounce gold ===
Year	Theme	Artist	Mintage	Issue Price	Finish
2004	Moose	N/A	25,000	$69.95	Proof
2005	Voyageur	N/A	25,000	$69.95	Proof
2006	Cowboy	Michelle Grant	25,000	$69.95	Proof
2007	The Wolf	William Woodruff	20,000	$74.95	Proof
2008	DeHavilland Beaver	Peter Mossman	20,000	$85.95	Proof
2009	Red Maple		15,000	$99.95	Proof
2010	RCMP		14,000	$109.95	Proof

=== Butterfly Collection ===
Year	Butterfly	Artist	Mintage	Issue Price	Finish
2004	Tiger swallowtail	Jianping Yan	19,910	$39.95	Hologram
2004	Clouded Sulphur	Susan Taylor	15,281	$39.95	Selective gold plating
2005	Monarch	Susan Taylor	20,000	$39.95	Colourized, orange and black
2005	Great Spangled Fritillary	Jianping Yan	20,000	$39.95	Hologram
2006	Short-tailed swallowtail	Susan Taylor	20,000	$39.95	Proof (with coloured butterfly)
2006	Silvery blue	Jianping Yan	20,000	$39.95	Hologram

=== 60th anniversary of the end of World War II ===
Year	Coin No 1	Coin No 2	Coin No 3	Coin No 4	Coin No 5	Coin No 6	Artist	Finish	Issue Price (for Six Coin Set)	Total Mintage
2005	Battle of Britain	Battle of the Atlantic	Raid on Dieppe	Conquest of Sicily	Liberation of the Netherlands	Battle of the Scheldt	Peter Mossman	Specimen	$149.95	20,000

=== 1/25-ounce gold ===
Year	Theme	Artist	Mintage	Issue price
2010	RCMP	Janet Griffin Scott	14,000	$109.95

== Commemorative Silver Dollar series ==
Year	Theme	Artist	Mintage (Proof)	Issue Price (Proof)	Mintage (BU)	Issue Price (BU)
2000	Voyage of Discovery	D.F. Warkentin	121,575	$29.95	62,975	$19.95
2001	50th Anniversary of the National Ballet of Canada	Dora de Pédery-Hunt	89,390	$30.95	53,668	$20.95
2001	90th Anniversary of the Striking of Canada's 1911 Silver Dollar	W.H.J. Blakemore	24,996	$49.95	No BU Exists	N/A
2002	Golden Jubilee of Elizabeth II	Royal Canadian Mint Staff	29,688	$33.95	64,410	$24.95
2002	The Queen Mother	Royal Canadian Mint Staff	9,994	$49.95	No BU exists	N/A
2003	Centennial of the Cobalt-Silver Strike at Cobalt, ON	John Mardon	88,536	$36.95	51,130	$28.95
2003	50th Anniversary of the Coronation of Queen Elizabeth II (First Effigy of Queen)	Emanuel Hahn	21,400	N/A	No BU exists	N/A
2003	50th Anniversary of the Coronation of Queen Elizabeth II (Fourth Effigy of Queen)	Emanuel Hahn	29,586	$51.95	No BU exists	N/A
2004	400th Anniversary, First French Settlement in North America	R.R. Carmichael	81,335	$36.95	41,934	$28.95
2004	400th Anniversary First French Settlement in North America, Privy Marked (part of Coin and Stamp Set)	R.R. Carmichael	8,315	$99.95	N/A	N/A
2004	The Poppy	Cosme Saffioti	24,527	$49.95	No BU Exists	N/A
2005	40th Anniversary, Flag of Canada	William Woodruff	N/A	$34.95	N/A	$24.95
2006	Victoria Cross	Royal Canadian Mint Staff	N/A	$34.95	N/A	$26.95
2006	Medal of Bravery	Royal Canadian Mint Staff	N/A	$54.95	No BU Exists	N/A
2007	Thayendanegea Joseph Brant	RCM Staff based on image by Laurie McGaw	65,000	42.95	35,000	34.95
2007	Celebration of the Arts	Friedrich Peter	20,000	$54.95	No BU Exists	N/A
2008	400th Anniversary of Quebec	Suzanne Duranceau	65,000	$42.95	35,000	$34.95
2008	100th Anniversary of Royal Canadian Mint	Jason Bouwman	25,000	$59.95	No BU Exists	N/A
2008	The Poppy (with ultra high relief)	Cosme Saffioti	5,000	$139.95	No BU Exists	N/A
2009	100th Anniversary of Flight	Jason Bouwman	50,000	$47.95	30,000	$39.95

=== Gold-plated proof Silver dollars ===
These gold-plated proof Silver Dollars were packaged with the corresponding proof sets for the year.

Year	Theme	Artist	Mintage	Issue price
2005	40th Anniversary, Canada's Flag	William Woodruff	N/A	$84.95
2006	Victoria Cross	Royal Canadian Mint Staff	N/A	$84.95
2007	Thayendanegea Joseph Brant	RCM Staff based on image by Laurie McGaw	N/A	$89.95
2008	400th Anniversary of Quebec	Suzanne Duranceau	60,000	$89.95
2009	100th Anniversary of Flight	Jason Bouwman	55,000	$99.95

== Collector cards ==
The first collector card that was issued was to commemorate the creation of a new effigy for her majesty Queen Elizabeth II in 2003 and a redemption was offered in Chatelaine magazine. In 2004, to commemorate the Acadie 25-cent coin. One card was included with every phone order after the launch of the commemorative coin. With the release of the Lucky Loonie, a third collector card was created. To procure a card, customers had to go on the RCM website and place a request online. A total of 23 collector coin cards have been released to date, mostly selling online for substantially more than they were when originally released.

=== 2003 ===
- Queen's Effigy

=== 2004 ===
- 400th Anniversary of Acadia (quarter)
- Lucky Loonie
- Poppy (quarter)

=== 2005 ===
- Alberta Centennial quarter
- Saskatchewan Centennial quarter
- Terry Fox loonie
- Victory nickel
- Year of the Veteran quarter

=== 2006 ===
- 10th Anniversary toonie
- Lucky Loonie
- Medal of Bravery (quarter)
- Pink Ribbon Breast Cancer quarter

=== 2007 ===
- Vancouver Olympics (15 quarters, 2 loonies)

=== 2008 ===
- 400th Anniversary of Quebec (toonie)

=== 2010 ===
- Poppy (2004, 2008, 2010 quarters)

=== 2011 ===
- Legendary Nature (toonie, loonie, 3 coloured and 3 non-coloured quarters)

=== 2012 ===
- War of 1812 (toonie, 8 coloured and 8 non-coloured quarters)

=== 2013 ===
- Arctic Expedition (4 quarters – 2 frosted, 2 unfrosted)

=== 2014 ===
- "Wait For Me, Daddy" (toonie)

=== 2015 ===
- Sir John A. MacDonald (toonie)
- 50th Anniversary of the Canadian Flag (1 coloured, 1 non-coloured)

== Definition of finishes ==
- Bullion

Brilliant relief against a parallel lined background

- Proof

Frosted relief against a mirror background

- Specimen

Brilliant relief on a satin background

== Mint marks ==
- A

Used on 2005 palladium test coin to signify the coins were struck from Lot A

- B

Used on 2005 palladium test coin to signify the coins were struck from Lot B

- C

Placed on sovereigns produced at the Ottawa branch of the Royal Mint, between 1908 and 1919

- Dot

In December 1936, King Edward VIII abdicated the throne in favour of his brother, who would become King George VI. The problem was that the Royal Mint was designing the effigy of King Edward VIII and now a new effigy would need to be created. The 1-, 10- and 25-cent pieces in 1937 would be struck from dies with a 1936 date on the reverse. To distinguish that these coins were issued in 1937, a Dot mint mark was placed on the 1936 dies, and could be found beneath the year. These coins fulfilled demand for coins until new coinage tools with the effigy of King George VI were ready. While the 10 and 25 cent coins are more common, the 1 cent coins are rare, with about a half-dozen known to exist.

- 06SFS

Used to describe the rare 2006 $50 Four Seasons 5-ounce silver coin. Only 2000 were minted.

- H

Used to identify coins that were struck for Canada by the Birmingham Mint, also known as the Heaton Mint, until 1907

- Innukshuk

All circulation coins for the 2010 Vancouver Olympics have the Innukshuk mint mark on the obverse of the coin

- International Polar Year

The obverse of the 2007 International Polar Year $20 numismatic coin has the logo for the International Polar Year on the obverse of the coin

- Man Becomes Mountain
  - (Symbol of Paralympics)

All circulation coins for the 2010 Vancouver Paralympics have the Paralympic Games logo on the obverse of the coin

- Maple Leaf

All coins with a Maple Leaf mint mark were struck in 1948 due to an emergency with coin toolage. The granting of India's independence resulted in the removal of IND:IMP (meaning Emperor of India) from King George VI’s effigy. Due to the demand for circulation coins in 1948, coins for 1948 could not be struck until the new tools were received. The new tools would have the IND:IMP removed from them. In the meanwhile, coins were produced in 1948 with a year of 1947 on them. A small Maple Leaf mint mark was struck beside 1947 on the reverse of all coins to signify the year of production.

- P

From 2001 to 2006, most one cent, five cents, ten cents, twenty-five cents, and fifty cents issued for circulation were struck with a P mint mark to represent the Royal Canadian Mint’s plating process.

- RCM Logo

At the CNA Convention in July 2006, the RCM unveiled its new mint mark to be used on all circulation and numismatic coinage. The agenda behind the implementation of this new mint mark was to help increase the RCM’s image as a brand. The aim of the logo is to educate coin users and coin collectors, respectively, that the RCM is minting Canada’s coins. The first Circulation Coin to have this new mint mark is the 10th Anniversary Two-Dollar coin. The first Numismatic Coin to have this new mint mark is the Snowbirds Coin and Stamp Set.

- T/É

In an effort to push the standard of quality higher, the RCM started to experiment with a gold bullion coin that would have a purity of 99.999%. The result was a Gold Maple Leaf Test Bullion coin with the mint mark of T/É (to signify Test/Épreuve). The date on the obverse of the coin was 2007 and it had a mintage of 500.

- Teddy bear

When the RCM released its Baby Lullabies and CD Set, a sterling silver one dollar coin was included in the set. The one dollar coin included a mint mark of a teddy bear.

- W

Used occasionally on specimen sets produced in Winnipeg, starting in 1998.

- W/P

Used on the Special Edition Uncirculated Set of 2003. The W mint mark stated that the coin was produced in Winnipeg and the P states that the coins are plated.
