= Nickel (Canadian coin) =

Canadian coin worth 5 cents

Five cents
- Canada
- Value: 0.05 Canadian dollar
- Mass: 3.95 g
- Diameter: 21.2 mm
- Thickness: 1.76 mm
- Edge: smooth (plain)
- Composition: Nickel-plated steel 94.5% steel, 3.5% Cu, 2% Ni plating
- Years of minting: 1858–present

Obverse
- Design: Charles III, King of Canada
- Designer: Steven Rosati
- Design date: 2023

Reverse
- Design: Beaver sitting on a rock
- Designer: G.E. Kruger Gray
- Design date: 1937

In Canada, a nickel, officially the five-cent piece, is a coin worth five cents, equal to 1/20 of a Canadian dollar. It was patterned on the corresponding coin in the neighbouring United States. It became the smallest-valued coin in the currency upon the discontinuation of the penny in 2013.

== History ==
The first coinage minted for what would later become the Canadian Confederation originated in legislation enacted in 1853. Per the Act 16 Vict. c. 158, the Province of Canada was to issue "dollars, cents, and mills" that would co-circulate with British shillings and pence. This law eventually came to fruition five years later in 1858 when new coins were ordered to improve the Canadian monetary system. Five-cent coins in particular were struck during this year in a sterling silver alloy, had a diameter of 15.5 mm, and weighed 17.93 grains per piece. A young bust of Queen Victoria appears on the coin's obverse, while the reverse is decorated with a wreath with the given date and denomination below a crown. This was a one year issue as silver coins in general were not minted for Canada as a whole again until 1870. (Note: Silver coinage continued for New Brunswick in the interim.) An issue arose due to the aftermath of the American Civil War, when currency of the United States dollar depreciated. Many unused silver coins were thus brought into Canada which disrupted the Canadian banking system. The Canadian government responded by expelling foreign silver coins and issuing new ones to take their place. Five-cent coins dated 1870 were all struck at the Royal Mint in London with the same weight and diameter as their 1858 counterparts.

== Types and specifications ==
Definitive types
Image	Years	Mass	Diameter	Composition
	1858–1901	1.16 g	15.5 mm	92.5% silver, 7.5% copper
	1902–1910	1.16 g	15.5 mm	92.5% silver, 7.5% copper
	1911–1921	1.17 g	15.5 mm	92.5% silver, 7.5% copper (1911–1919); 80% silver, 20% copper (1920–1921)
	1922–1936	4.54 g	21.21 mm	99.9% nickel
	1937–1942	4.54 g	21.21 mm	99.9% nickel
	1942–1945	4.54 g	21.3 mm	88% copper, 12% zinc (tombac) (1942–1943); Chrome plated steel (1944–1945)
	1946–1952	4.54 g	21.3 mm	99.9% nickel (1946–1951); Chrome plated steel (1951–1952)
	1953–1964	4.54 g	21.3 mm	Chrome plated steel (1953–1954); 99.9% nickel (1955–1964)
	1965–1981	4.54 g	21.3 mm	99.9% nickel
	1982–1989	4.6 g	21.2 mm	75% copper, 25% nickel
	1990–2001, 2006 (No "P" on obverse)	4.6 g	21.2 mm	75% copper, 25% nickel
	1999–2006 (With "P")	3.95 g	21.2 mm	94.5% steel, 3.5% copper, 2% nickel plating
	2003–2022 (With RCM logo on obverse)	3.95 g	21.2 mm	94.5% steel, 3.5% copper, 2% nickel plating
	2023–present	3.95 g	21.2 mm	94.5% steel, 3.5% copper, 2% nickel plating

== Circulation figures ==
=== Victoria and Edward VII ===
Year	Mintage	Notes
1858	1,500,000	This figure includes the small date, and large date over small date varieties.
1870	2,800,000	This figure includes the "Flat rim" and "Wire rim" varieties.
1871	1,400,000	Two different varieties have a 1 over 1 and 7 over 7 in the date.
1872 H	2,000,000	The "H" on the coin refers to "Ralph Heaton & Sons".
1874 H	800,000	This figure includes the "Plain 4" and "Crosslet 4" varieties.
1875 H	1,000,000	This figure includes the small and large date varieties.
1880 H	3,000,000	
1881 H	1,500,000	
1882 H	1,000,000	
1883 H	600,000	
1884	200,000	Key date, lowest mintage of the Victorian and Edwardian eras.
1885	1,000,000	This figure includes the "small 5", "large 5", and " large 5 over small 5" varieties.
1886	1,700,000	This figure includes the "small" and "large 6" varieties.
1887	500,000	Includes a "7 over 7" date variety.
1888	1,000,000	
1889	1,200,000	
1890 H	1,000,000	
1891	1,800,000	
1892	860,000	
1893	1,700,000	
1894	500,000	No coins were minted in 1895.
1896	1,500,000	
1897	1,319,283	Varieties include a "wide" and "narrow" 8, and a "narrow 8 over a wide 8" in the date.
1898	580,717	
1899	3,000,000	
1900	1,800,000	This figure includes the "Oval" and "Round 0's" varieties.
1901 Victoria	2,000,000	
1902 Edward VII	2,120,000	
1902 H	2,200,000	This figure includes the "large broad" and "small narrow" H varieties.
1903	1,000,000	
1903 H	2,640,000	
1904	2,400,000	
1905	2,600,000	Varieties include a "wide" and "narrow" date and a 5 over 5.
1906	3,100,000	Varieties include a "wide" and "narrow" date and a "low 6".
1907	5,200,000	Varieties include a "wide" and "narrow" date and a "low 7".
1908	1,220,524	Varieties include a "small" and "large" 8 in the date.
1909	1,983,725	This figure includes the "round/rounded" and "pointed" leaves varieties.
1910	3,850,325	This figure includes the "round/rounded" and "pointed" leaves varieties.

=== George V and George VI ===
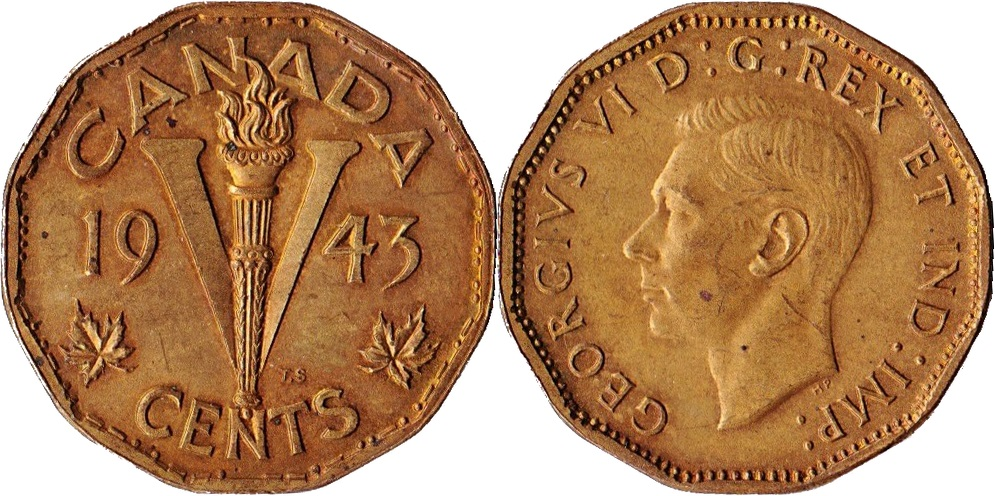
World War II "Victory" nickel in Tombac

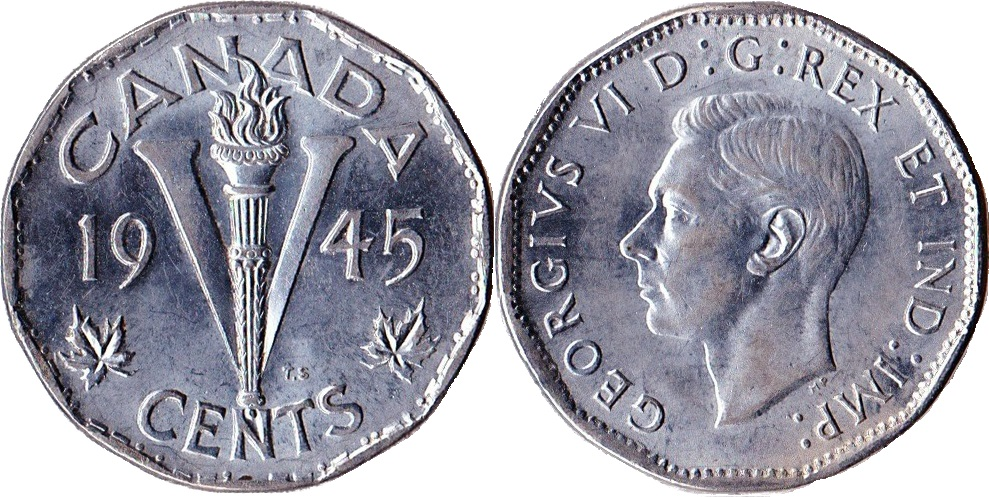
World War II "Victory" nickel in Steel

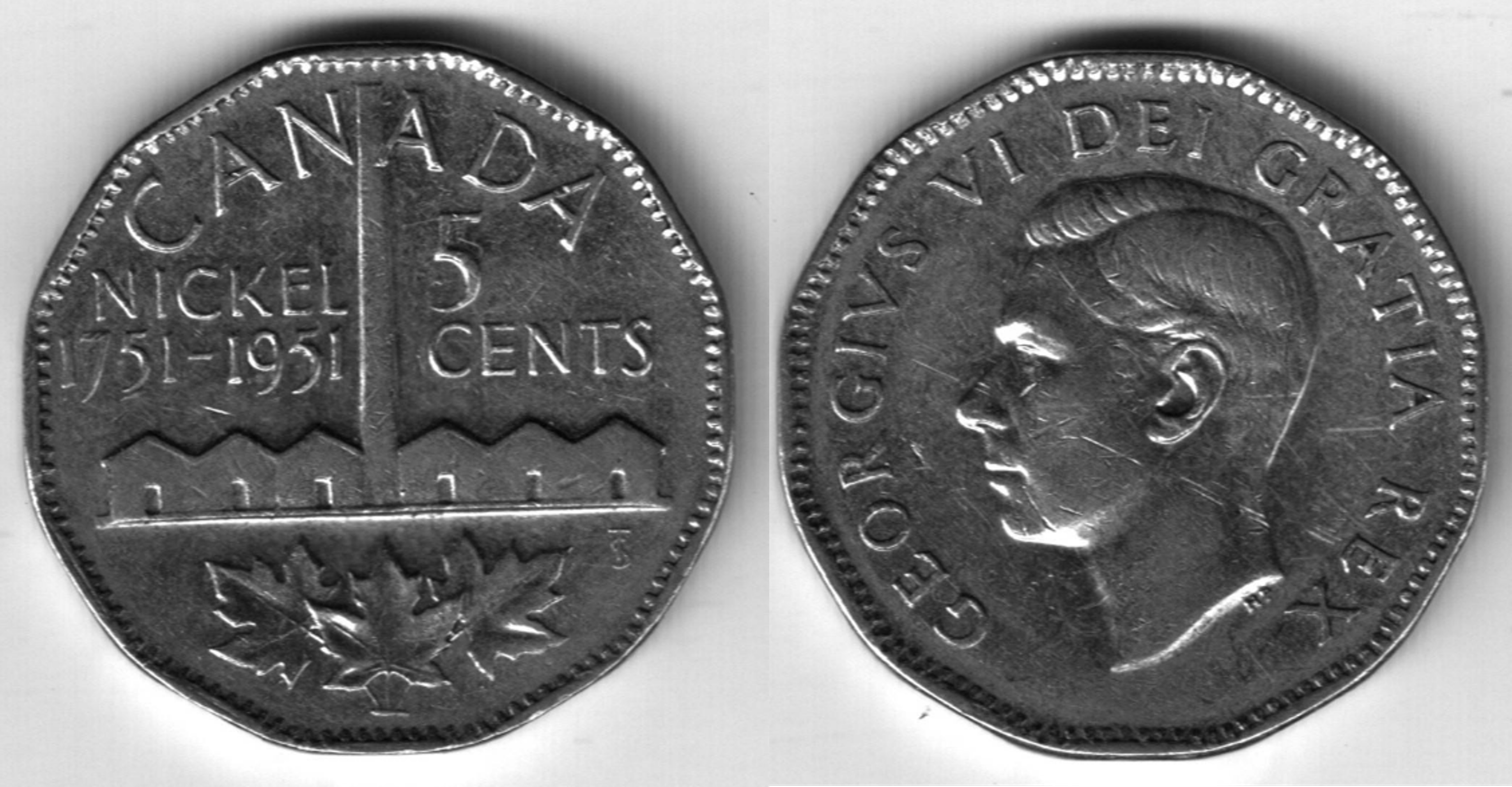
200th anniversary of the discovery of nickel

Year	Mintage	Notes
1911	3,692,350	No "Dei gratia": The words "Dei gratia" were removed from the obverse of the coin to make room for "Ind:Imp:" (Emperor of India). It was restored in 1912 after public backlash.
1912	5,863,170	With "Dei gra": The wording was restored to the obverse of the coin around the king's bust.
1913	5,588,048 (Note: The official mintage given by the RCM is disputed with secondary sourcing from Krause Publications.)	
1914	4,202,179	
1915	1,172,258	
1916	2,481,675	
1917	5,521,373	
1918	6,052,289	
1919	7,835,400	
1920	10,649,851	
1921	2,582,495	Approximately 460 "1921" dated coins are now known as almost all of these were remelted at the mint.
1922	4,763,186	
1923	2,475,201	
1924	3,066,658	
1925	200,050	Key date, lowest mintage of the George V/VI eras.
1926	933,577	This figure includes the "near" and "far" 6 varieties.
1927	5,285,627	
1928	4,588,725	
1929	5,562,262	
1930	3,685,991	
1931	5,100,830	
1932	3,198,566	Varieties include a "near" and "far" 2.
1933	2,597,867	
1934	3,827,303	
1935	3,900,000	
1936 George V	4,400,450	
1937 George VI	4,593,263	
1938	3,898,974	
1939	5,661,123	
1940	13,820,197 (Note: The official mintage given by the RCM is disputed with secondary sourcing from Krause Publications.)	
1941	8,681,785	
1942 Nickel	6,847,544	
1942 Tombac	3,396,234	
1943 Tombac	24,760,256	Intended to stimulate the war effort. The message "We Win When We Work Willingly" is engraved in Morse code on the rim of the coin.
1944 Steel (Note: One "1944" dated coin is known to have survived in Tombac.)	11,532,784	Intended to stimulate the war effort. The message "We Win When We Work Willingly" is engraved in Morse code on the rim of the coin.
1945 Steel	18,893,216	
1946 Nickel	6,952,684	
1947	7,603,724	The "dot" variety is included in this figure.
1947 Maple Leaf	9,595,124	Obverse "IND: IMP:" aka Indiae Imperator (Emperor of India) removed.
1948	1,810,789	
1949	13,736,276	
1950	11,950,520	
1951 Beaver	4,313,410	Struck in nickel-plated steel, this figure includes the scarce high relief and common low relief varieties.
1951 Nickel Bicentennial	9,028,507	Struck in nickel, the reverse design features a nickel refinery for the 200th anniversary of the discovery of the alloy.
1952	10,891,148	Struck in nickel-plated steel

=== Elizabeth II ===
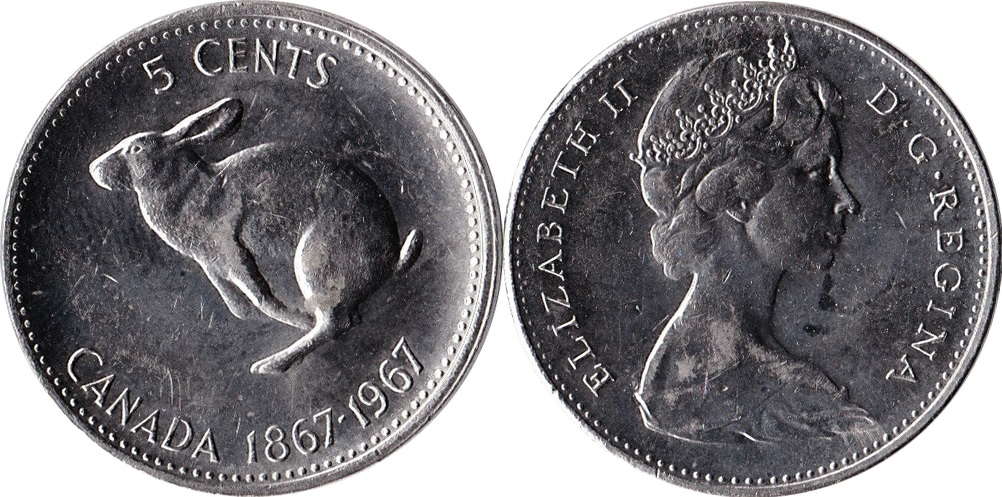
Canadian Centennial nickel

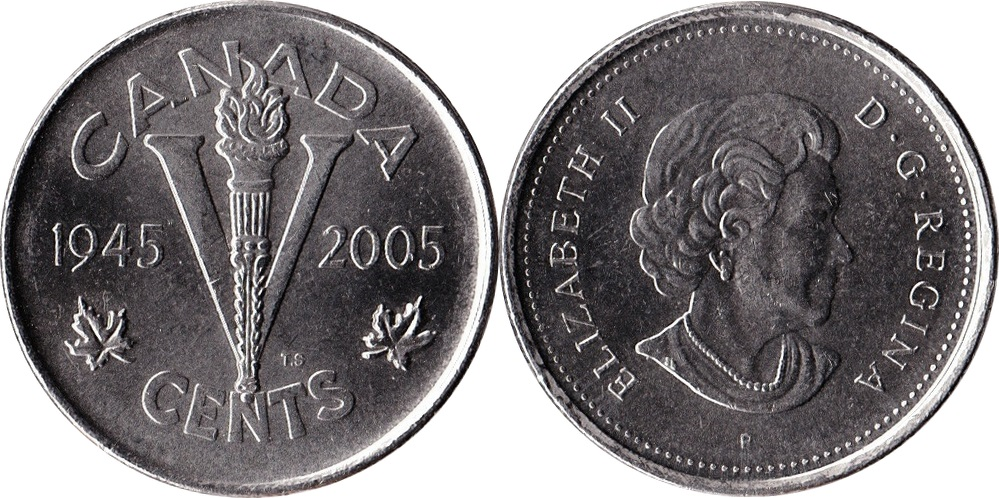
60th anniversary of the end of World War II

Year	Mintage	Notes
1953	16,635,552	This figure includes the "strap", "no strap", and "near"/"far" leaf varieties.
1954	6,998,662	Struck in nickel-plated steel
1955	5,355,028	Struck in nickel
1956	9,399,854	
1957	7,387,703	
1958	7,607,521	
1959	11,552,523	
1960	37,157,433	
1961	47,889,051	
1962	46,307,305	
1963	43,970,320	
1964	78,075,068	This figure includes the "extra water line" variety.
1965	84,876,018	This figure includes the "small" and "large" beads varieties.
1966	27,976,648	
1967	36,876,574	Canadian Centennial; this nickel features a hopping rabbit and is dated 1867–1967.
1968	99,253,330	
1969	27,830,229	
1970	5,726,010	
1971	27,312,609	
1972	62,417,387	
1973	53,507,435	
1974	94,704,645	
1975	138,882,000	
1976	55,140,213	
1977	89,120,791	This figure includes the "high" and "low" 7 varieties.
1978	137,079,273	
1979	186,295,825	
1980	134,878,000	
1981	99,107,900	First recorded year of proof strikes.
1982	64,924,400	Cupronickel alloy
1983	72,596,000	
1984	84,088,000	
1985	126,618,000	
1986	156,104,000	
1987	106,299,000	
1988	75,025,000	
1989	141,435,538	
1990	42,537,000	
1991	10,931,000	
1992	53,732,000	125th anniversary of the Confederation of Canada; this nickel is dated 1867–1992.
1993	86,877,000	
1994	99,352,000	
1995	78,528,000	
1996	36,686,000	This figure includes the "near" and "far" 6 varieties.
1997	27,354,000	
1998	156,873,000	
1999	124,861,000	About 20,000 coins were minted with a "P" (nickel-plated steel alloy) mark under Elizabeth's portrait on the obverse.
2000	108,514,000	
2000 P	2,300,000	
2001	30,035,000	
2001 P	136,650,000	
2002 P	135,960,000	Elizabeth II Golden Jubliee; dated 1952–2002
2003	61,392,180	
2003 P	31,388,921	
2004 P	123,925,000	
2005 P	148,082,000	
2005 P WWII ANV	59,269,192	60th anniversary of the end of World War II; this nickel is dated 1945–2005.
2006	43,008,000	
2006 P	184,874,000	
2007	221,472,000	
2008	278,530,000	
2009	266,448,000	
2010	126,800,000	
2011	230,328,000	
2012	202,944,000	
2013	78,120,000	
2014	66,364,000	
2015	87,360,000	
2016	140,952,000	
2017	126,680,000	
2017 150th Anv	20,000,000	150th anniversary of the Confederation of Canada; this nickel is dated 1867–2017.
2018	87,528,000	
2019	92,736,000	
2020	31,752,000	
2021	68,376,000	
2022	83,328,000	

=== Charles III ===
Year	Mintage	Notes
2023	28,422,000	First year of issue with a bust of Charles III facing left as per custom
2024	61,824,000	
2025	TBA	

== Commemoratives ==
Date	Mintage	Reason
1998	25,000	90th anniversary of the Royal Canadian Mint (matte finish)
1998	25,000	90th anniversary of the Royal Canadian Mint (mirror finish)
2001	59,573	Sesquicentennial of Canada's first postage stamp
2001	25,834	125th anniversary of the Royal Military College
2002	22,646	85th anniversary of the Battle of Vimy Ridge (World War I)
2003	33,490	Elizabeth II (Golden Jubilee)
2004	20,019	60th anniversary of D-Day (Note: A circulating version of this coin celebrating the end of World War II later appeared in 2005.)
2005	42,792	60th anniversary of the end of World War II; this nickel is dated 1945–2005. (Note: This nickel came in a set, was struck in silver, and features George VI on the obverse with the original Morse code edge. 6,065 of these coins were also struck in gold-plating.)
2010	4,996	75th anniversary of Canada's Voyageur Silver Dollar
2011	6,000	100th anniversary of George V on Canadian coins
2017	8,017	150th anniversary of the Confederation of Canada (Centennial rabbit; 2017 version)
2017	20,000	150th anniversary of the Confederation of Canada (our home and native land)
2017	5,500	150th anniversary of the Confederation of Canada (the forgotten 1927 designs)
2020	15,000	75th anniversary of VE-Day (Note: This coin is identical to its D-Day 60th anniversary counterpart, but is dated 1945–2020.)
2023	952,000	Elizabeth II (Platinum Jubilee)

== Collecting ==
According to author Allen G. Berman, Canadian nickels struck in pure nickel are "very difficult to grade" due to the alloy's hardness. Five-cent coins dated 1921 are among the rarest and most collectible Canadian circulation coins, known as "the Prince of Canadian Coins." Estimates of the number of specimens known range between 400 and 480. In May 1921, the government of Canada passed an act authorizing the change to the larger nickel coin, and subsequently the majority of the 1921 mint run was melted down. The coin believed to be the finest-known specimen (PCGS MS-67) sold for US$115,000 at auction in January 2010. It was then sold by the Canadian Numismatic Company for $160,000 to a private collector in early 2012.

== See also ==
- Big Nickel
- Dei Gratia Regina (or Rex), which appears abbreviated on the face of the coin.
