= Dynamic Earth (Ontario) =

- Location within Ontario
- Established: 2003
- Location: 122 Big Nickel Road; Sudbury, Ontario; P3C 5T7
- Coordinates: 46.47416°N 81.03288°W
- Type: Science museum
- Website: www.sciencenorth.ca/dynamic-earth/

Dynamic Earth is an interactive earth sciences museum in Greater Sudbury, Ontario, Canada. Owned-and-operated by Science North, Dynamic Earth builds on the city's mining heritage, focusing principally on geology and mining history exhibitions.

The centre, which opened in 2003, is home to the Big Nickel, one of the city's most famous landmarks.

== Tours ==
Dynamic Earth offers tours of the mine. The tour starts with a seven-story elevator ride descending to a cavern. Then the tour goes through a demonstration mine to showcase the evolution of mining from turn-of-the-century to modern day. The mine's temperature are averages at 13°C (55°F) all year long.

The science park has activities such as interactive historical mining equipment, interior playground, and gold sifting. During the winter, Sudbury Snow trails are managed by Dynamic Earth Science North working with northern communities to offer a "Northern Nature Trading experience" where visitors can trade and build collections of natural objects. In 2013, Science North had 44,000 student visits and almost 47,000 participants in science programs and workshops.

In July 2026, Dynamic Earth opened up a new drift underground for the Next Generation Mine Tour which is a 45 minute tour about current and future mining that cost $14.9 million dollars to build.

== Affiliations ==
The museum is affiliated with the Canadian Museums Association, the Canadian Heritage Information Network and the Virtual Museum of Canada. The building was used to gather data for FLAC and Numerical Modeling in Geomechanics which is responsible for modeling the Greater Sudbury Area.

This project was combined into two phases, Research and construction, Significant financial contributions included: C$463,000: Northern Ontario Heritage Fund Corporation, C$499,000: Independent Electricity System Operator's Conservation Fund, C$620,000: Electrale Innovation and MIRARCO – Mining Innovation.
