= Thomas Shingles =

Canadian engraver (1903–1984)

Thomas Shingles (3 April 1903 – 31 May 1984) was the Master Engraver of the Royal Canadian Mint from 1943 until his retirement in 1965; he first began work at the Mint in 1939. He was born in Birmingham, England.

Shingles was responsible for several of the images on Canadian coinage, including the Second World War V-variant nickel, which he designed in 1943 at the behest of Mint staff; although most coin designs are done at full size and then reduced via a pantograph, Shingles chose to produce this design in miniature.

Other designs by Shingles include the 1959 updating of the 50 cent piece to include the Canadian coat of arms; as with all of Shingles' work, the coin includes his initials "TS". He also designed the majority of Canadian commemorative coinage during his tenure as Master Engraver.

Shingles retired from the Mint in 1965, but continued to work as a freelance artist. In 1970, he entered a contest to design the 1971 Canadian dollar coin and took first prize, being awarded $3,500.

== Archives ==
There are two collections of Thomas Shingles's work at Library and Archives Canada. The Thomas Shingles Collection (archival reference number 1974-023 MED) contains 150 medals and 85 artifacts; the Ronald Greene collection (archival reference number R16845) contains 10 original drawings for medals for the Royal Canadian Mint. The material dates from 1800 to 1970.
