= Big Nickel =

Giant replica of a 1951 Canadian nickel

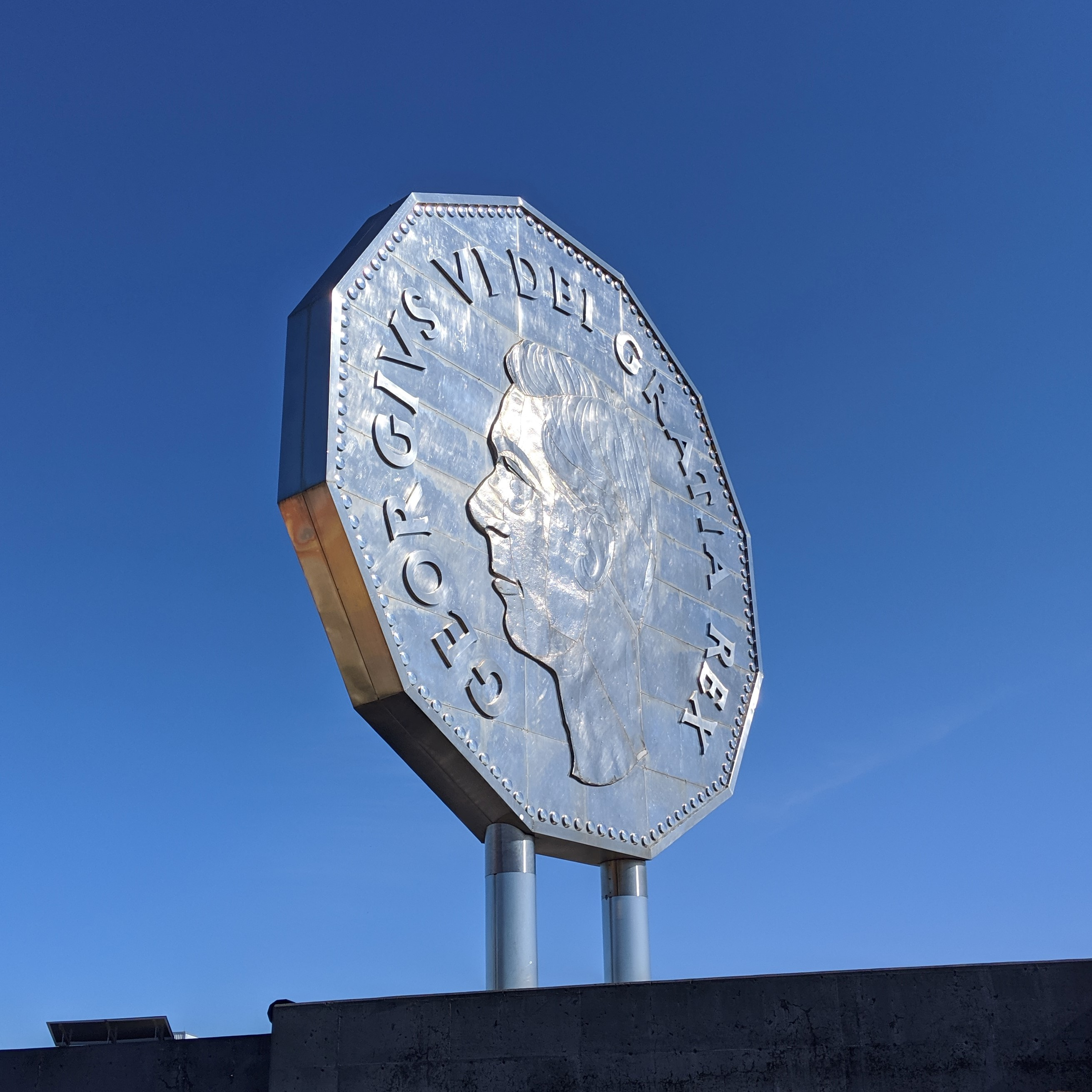
- The Big Nickel in 2022
- Interactive map of Big Nickel
- Location: Dynamic Earth, Greater Sudbury, Ontario, Canada
- Coordinates: 46°28′24″N 81°02′01″W
- Designer: Bruno Cavallo, Ted Szilva
- Type: Roadside attraction
- Material: Stainless steel
- Height: 12.8 m (42 ft) (with pedestal); 9 m (30 ft) (without pedestal)
- Opening date: July 22, 1964

The Big Nickel is a roadside attraction in the shape of a 1951 Canadian nickel, located at the Dynamic Earth science centre in Greater Sudbury, Ontario, Canada. The Big Nickel was completed in 1964, and is 9 m (30 ft) in height atop a 3.6 m (12 ft) base. It is the world's largest coin.

== History ==
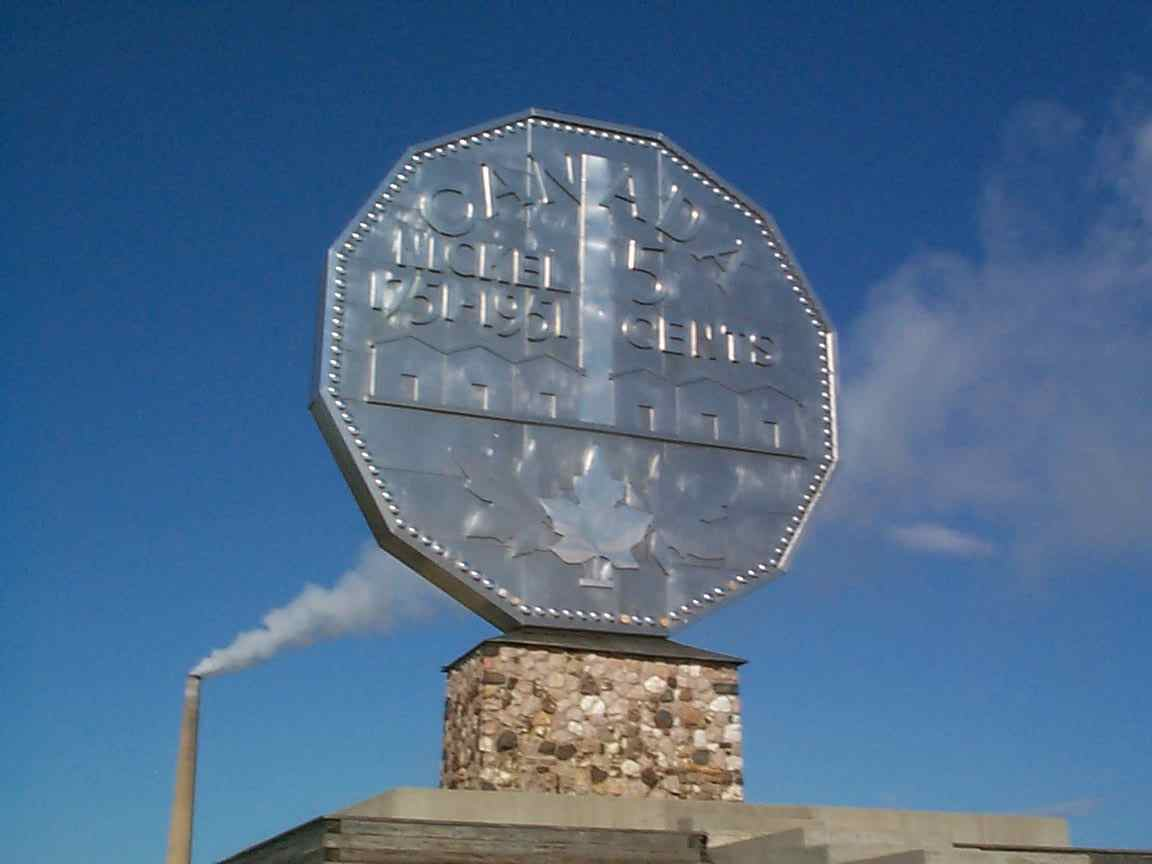
Big Nickel on its original pedestal

The idea for the Big Nickel began in 1963 when Ted Szilva, a local fireman, proposed to the Sudbury Centennial Committee an attraction featuring a replica of a five-cent coin, an underground mine, and a mining science centre. While the proposal was rejected, Szilva continued to pursue the concept.

In December 1963, he purchased land overlooking the Copper Cliff smelter between Sudbury and Copper Cliff. After acquiring the land, Szilva was unable to obtain a building permit from the city for the monument or road access to the property. Ultimately leasing additional land from Inco, the Big Nickel was built three feet 0.9 m (3.0 ft) outside of Sudbury in the adjacent town of Copper Cliff, which did not require Szilva to obtain a building permit.

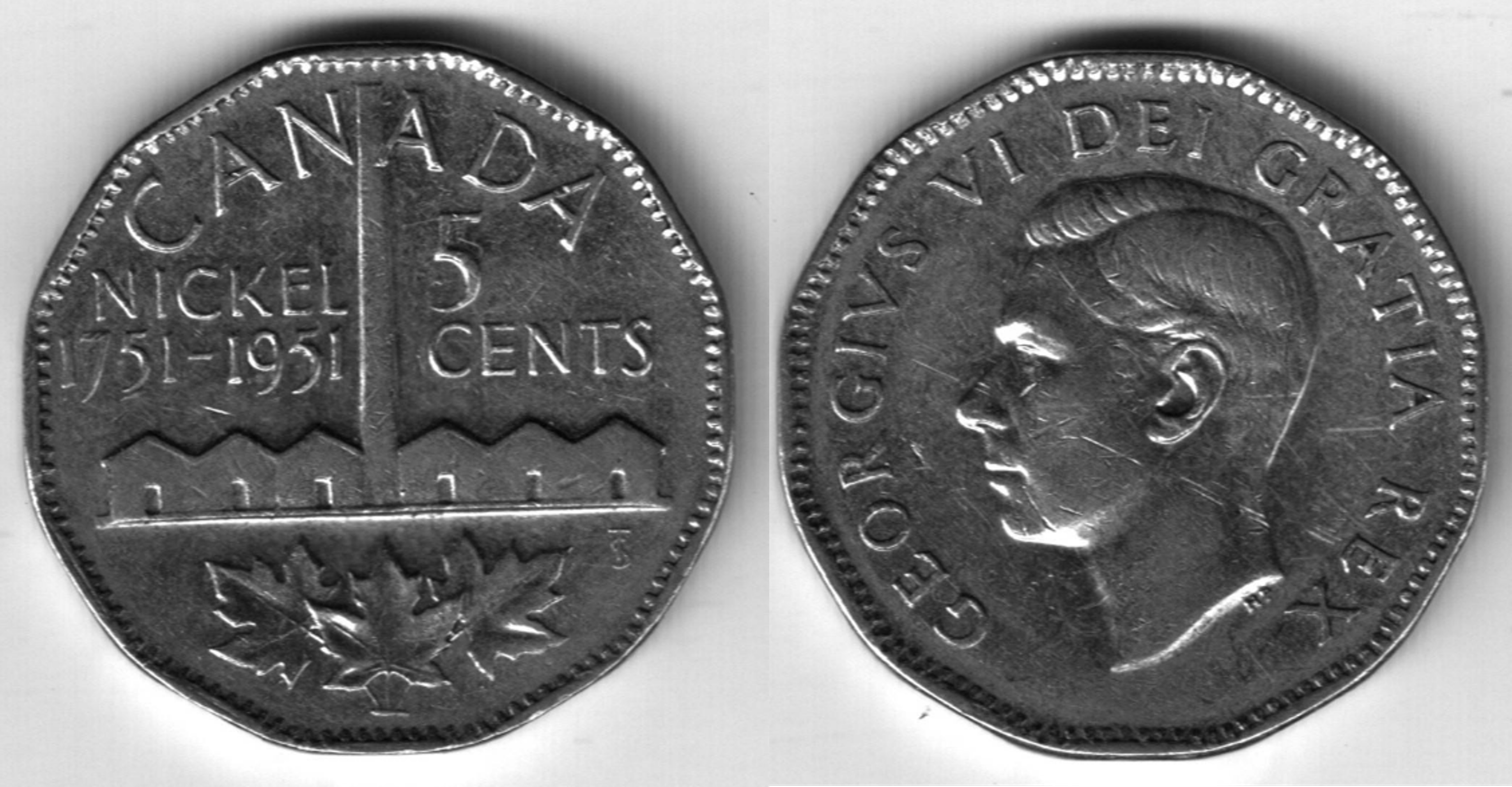
The 1951 nickel chosen for the Big Nickel

For the design of the coin, Szilva chose a 1951 five-cent piece designed by Stephen Trenka, which commemorated the 200th anniversary of the isolation of nickel as a metal and featured King George VI on its obverse. The design of the Big Nickel itself was created by Bruno Cavallo, a local sign manufacturer and artist.

Cavallo sketched out the design by tracing an image of the coin against a large wall at the Sudbury Steelworkers Hall. The traced sections were then transported to his shop where he handcrafted the numerous steel sheets from a wooden mould. The individual parts were then fastened to a moulded girdle structure and joined with silver solder. The large stainless steel panels of the coin were fabricated in Toronto and shipped to the Big Nickel site in May 1964. When completed, the Big Nickel was 9 m (30 ft) tall and 0.61 m (2.0 ft) thick. Opening on July 22, 1964, the total cost of the construction of the Big Nickel was approximately CA$35,000 (equivalent to $350,427 in 2025).

=== Sudbury Numismatic Park ===
The Big Nickel was followed by four additional coins which were dismantled in 1984. The other coins were a Canadian Penny, a Lincoln Penny, a Kennedy Half Dollar and a gold 1967 Confederation twenty dollar coin. A miniature mine, carousel, and miniature train were also installed, with the miniature mine later evolving into Dynamic Earth. The site was sold to Science North in 1981.

== Refurbishment ==
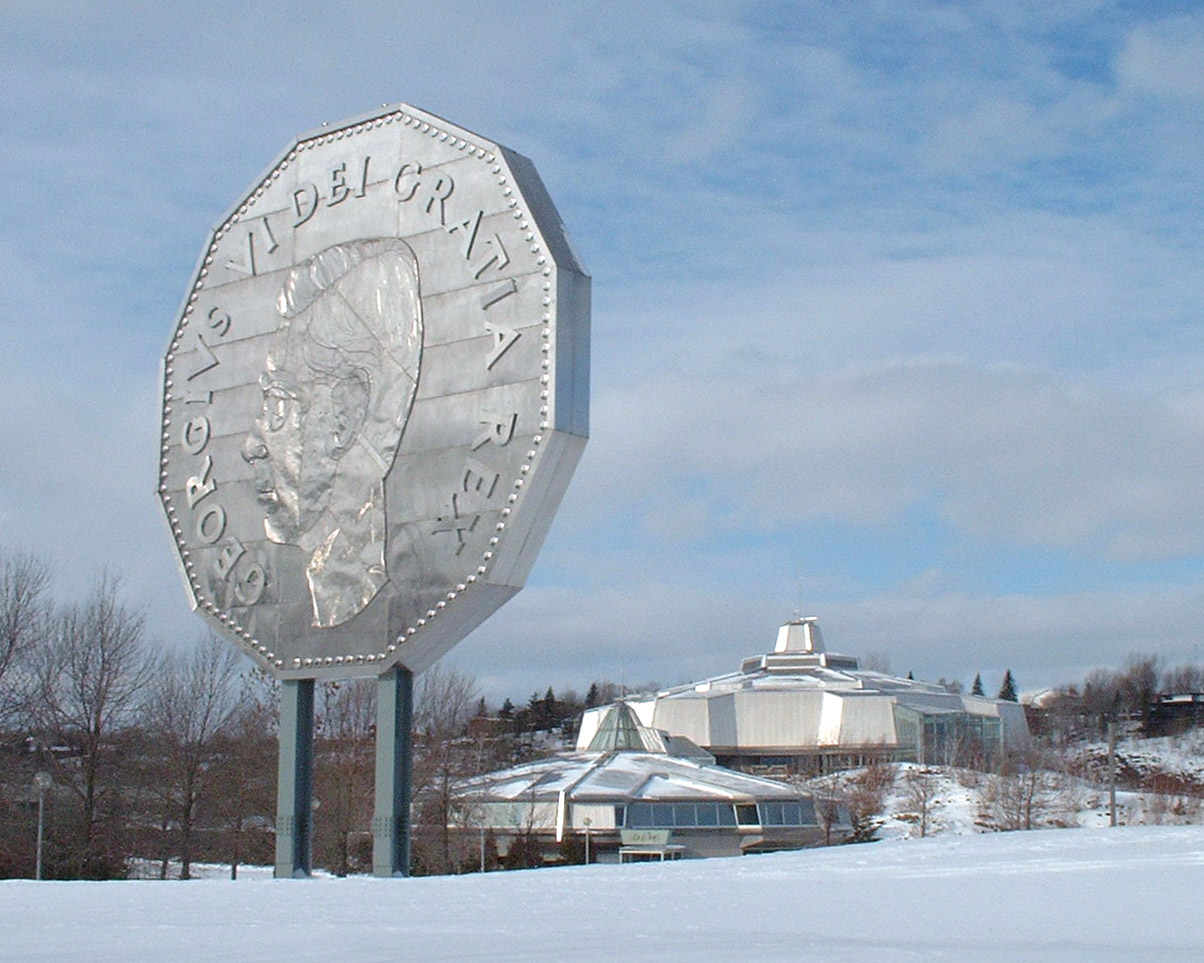
The Big Nickel at Science North

On January 22, 2001, the Big Nickel was dismantled for refurbishing. Once refurbished, the coin was installed on the grounds of Science North while the original Big Nickel site reconstructed as Dynamic Earth. On May 10, 2003, it was moved back and installed on a new base at Dynamic Earth.

In 2017, the face of the Big Nickel became a screen with the installation of a projection mapping projector, allowing for light shows to be projected onto the coin.

== See also ==
- Echo Bay, Ontario is home to the Big Loonie
- Campbellford, Ontario is home to the Big Toonie
