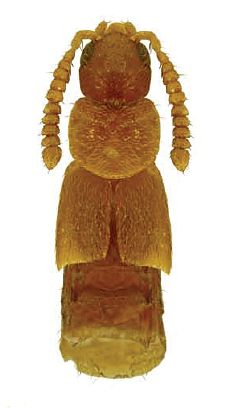
- Alisalia austiniana

Scientific classification
- Kingdom: Animalia
- Phylum: Arthropoda
- Clade: Pancrustacea
- Class: Insecta
- Order: Coleoptera
- Suborder: Polyphaga
- Infraorder: Staphyliniformia
- Family: Staphylinidae
- Subfamily: Aleocharinae
- Tribe: Oxypodini; Thomson, 1859

= Oxypodini =

Tribe of beetles

Oxypodini is a tribe of rove beetles in the family Staphylinidae. There are more than 50 genera and 580 described species in Oxypodini.

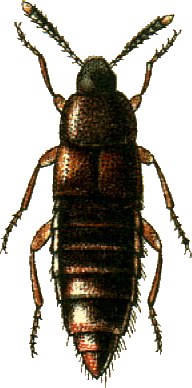
Thiasophila angulata

== Genera ==
These 52 genera belong to the tribe Oxypodini:

- Acrimea Casey, 1911
- Alfocalea Klimaszewski in Klimaszewski & Pelletier, 2004
- Alisalia Casey, 1911
- Amarochara Thomson, 1858
- Apimela Mulsant & Rey, 1874
- Bamona Sharp, 1883
- Betocalea Klimaszewski in Klimaszewski & Pelletier, 2004
- Blepharhymenus Solier, 1849
- Brachyusa Mulsant & Rey, 1874
- Calodera Mannerheim, 1831
- Crataraea Thomson, 1858
- Decusa Casey, 1900
- Devia Blackwelder, 1952
- Dexiogyia Thomson, 1858
- Euthotorax Solier, 1849
- Gennadota Casey, 1906
- Gnathusa Fenyes, 1909
- Gnypeta Thomson, 1858
- Gnypetella Casey, 1906
- Gyronycha Casey, 1893
- Haploglossa Kraatz, 1856
- Hylota Casey, 1906
- Ilyobates Kraatz, 1856
- Leptobamona Casey, 1911
- Liometoxenus Kistner, Jensen & Jacobson, 2002
- Longipeltina Bernhauer, 1912
- Losiusa Seevers, 1978
- Megocalea Klimaszewski in Klimaszewski & Pelletier, 2004
- Melanalia Casey, 1911
- Meotica Mulsant & Rey, 1873
- Meronera Sharp, 1887
- Metocalea Klimaszewski in Klimaszewski & Pelletier, 2004
- Myrmobiota Casey, 1893
- Neoisoglossa Klimaszewski in Klimaszewski & Pelletier, 2004
- Neothetalia Klimaszewski in Klimaszewski & Pelletier, 2004
- Ocalea Erichson, 1837
- Ocyusa Kraatz, 1856
- Ocyustiba Lohse & Smetana, 1988
- Oxypoda Mannerheim, 1831
- Pachycerota Casey, 1906
- Paradilacra Bernhauer, 1909
- Parocalea Bernhauer, 1902
- Parocyusa Bernhauer, 1902
- Pentanota Bernhauer, 1905
- Phloeopora Erichson, 1837
- Pyraglossa Bernhauer, 1901
- Tachyusa Erichson, 1837
- Teliusa Casey, 1906
- Tetralaucopora Bernhauer, 1928
- Thiasophila Kraatz, 1856
- Thyasophila Fairmaire & Laboulbene, 1856
- Trachyota Casey, 1906
