= Tachyusini =

Scientific classification
- Kingdom: Animalia
- Phylum: Arthropoda
- Clade: Pancrustacea
- Class: Insecta
- Order: Coleoptera
- Suborder: Polyphaga
- Infraorder: Staphyliniformia
- Family: Staphylinidae
- Subfamily: Aleocharinae
- Tribe: Tachyusini; Thomson, 1859

Tribe of beetles

Tachyusini is a tribe of rove beetles in the subfamily Aleocharinae. It was first described by C.G. Thomson in 1859. It contains 29 genera, with 387 accepted species. The majority of recorded observations of members of Tachyusini have taken place in Sweden, The United Kingdom, and Norway. Observations occur year-round, but peak from May-July each year.

== Genera ==
- Almoria
- Belladona
- Brachyusa
- Caenopoda
- Ctenatheta
- Dacrila
- Dasygnypeta
- Dasytricheta
- Dilacra
- Ecomorypora
- Gnypeta
- Gnypetalia
- Gnypetella
- Ischnopoda
- Ischnopoderona
- Neolara
- Outachyusa
- Paradilacra
- Paragnypeta
- Paratachyusa
- Pseudogonypeta
- Tachyusa
- Tachyusopoda
- Teliusa
- Tetragnypeta
- Thinonoma
- Thripsophaga
- Weineria
