= Starlight Spectacular (Canada's Wonderland) =

Sound and light show at Canada's Wonderland

Canada's Wonderland
- Area: International Street
- Coordinates: 43°50′34″N 79°32′25″W
- Cost: CA$4,000,000
- Replaced: The Eruption (1998–2001)
- Replaced by: Illuminations of Water (2013-15); Northern Reflections (2017-18)

Ride statistics
- Attraction type: Son et lumière, musical fountain
- Manufacturers: Canada's Wonderland Creative; Crystal Fountains
- Designer: Canada's Wonderland Creative
- Model: Starlight Version 8.0.0 (2019)
- Duration: 2011: 10:30 minutes 2012: 11:12 minutes 2016: 11:15 minutes
- Show status: Closed, unloaded for season
- Wheelchair accessible
- Assistive listening available

Starlight Spectacular is a nightly sound-and-light show at Canada's Wonderland. It takes place at the theme park's International Street at approximately 10:00 pm during the regular park season. The show was introduced to the theme park in 2011 to celebrate its 30th anniversary. It has also played during the 2012, 2016, and 2019 regular park seasons. Canada's Wonderland stated that the total cost for the opening season was approximately one million dollars with 16 million different colours and 300,000 LED lights. Wonder Mountain, the primary symbol of the park, is the focus of the show as lighting effects are projected onto its surface with many colours and 3D effects. The show was created and designed by Tantrum Design for its first two seasons, with subsequent work by the park's production team in cooperation with the companies that supplied new lighting and fountain equipment.

== Description ==
Starlight Spectacular is one of a number of outdoor shows presented at International Street, the main promenade of Canada's Wonderland between the theme park's entrance and Wonder Mountain. Running the length of International Street is a 91-by-24-metre (300 by 80 ft) water basin, known as Royal Fountain, which has hundreds of programmable water jets.

The sound-and-light show is performed in the evening at approximately 10 pm (weather permitting), and acts to guide visitors for the park's daily closing. Performances project light shows onto Wonder Mountain and the programmable water jets of Royal Fountain, accompanied by music and sound effects. The images projected were precisely mapped for the dimensions and contours of the mountain. The apparatus for the show is also used during the Halloween Haunt season, in which effects are intermittently projected onto Wonder Mountain. Starlight Spectacular was first presented in the 2011 season for the park's 30th anniversary.

=== Original production ===
Starlight Spectacular played in four scenes, fading to darkness in between. The first scene has a theme of the seasons, beginning with images of maple leaves (a national symbol of Canada) blowing around Wonder Mountain, then falling snowflakes and effects which made Wonder Mountain appear to be frozen. The snow then began to disappear and plants grew, and a rainbow and butterflies appeared around the mountain.

The second scene begins with lightning effects and parts of the mountain appearing to explode and release lava. One lightning strike opens a large cave in the mountain; a dragon- or dinosaur-like creature emerges, roars, and blows fire which covers the entire mountain.

The third scene features geometric displays with 3D effects, in which images of white, blue, green, and red cubes and squares of various sizes move and interact. An optical illusion then made the mountain appear to move up and down, left and right, and tilt. Cubes reappeared, moving in all directions, followed by coloured strings. The mountain then seems to collapse.

In the fourth scene, the peaks of the mountain are lit to visibility one by one, and appear to be moving in rhythm with mechanical sounds. Images of rotating gears are then projected on the lower portions of the mountain, giving the impression of a giant machine. The mountain peaks move faster as the gears grow larger. Lights seem to shoot out of the gears and fly around the mountain, leaving string-like trails. Smaller lights appeared descending down the mountain.

Water jets synchronize with the accompanying music, which grows in intensity. Blue lights then appear on the mountain's two largest waterfalls, with jellyfish-like images beside them. Vibrant rainbow colours flash across the mountain, then imitate the four waterfalls. The image of a giant disco ball appears, seeming to flash coloured spots before falling down the mountain. Circles and stars fly around the mountain, followed by animated fireworks and balloons. The dinosaur reappears wearing a party hat and dances, and the words "Happy 30th Birthday Canada's Wonderland" appears along with more animated fireworks and balloons.

This 2011 show lasted 10 minutes and 30 seconds.

=== Variations ===
For the 2012 season, Starlight Spectacular begins with the image of a passenger train on the waterfall diving ledge, surrounded by cutout animations of Canadian landmarks while the corresponding provincial flags are displayed on the mountaintop. Attention is brought to a maple leaf which then begins the "seasons" scene. A roller coaster replaces the star scene, and the dragon emerges from behind the waterfalls instead of a cave, and is not wearing a party hat at the end, where the "Happy 30th Birthday" is omitted.

During the 2013–2015 seasons, the closing shows were called Illuminations of Water. These musical fountain shows featured lighting effects on the upgraded fountains, synchronized to music, with some of the projections from Starlight Spectacular used on Wonder Mountain as a supporting backdrop.

Starlight Spectacular returned in 2016, with minor changes to the show to take advantage of the fountain upgrades.

During the 2017 and 2018 seasons, the closing shows were called Northern Reflections, which celebrated the 150th anniversary of Canada. These shows added new scenes and lasers.

Starlight Spectacular returned again for the 2019 season.

Starlight Spectacular was put on hiatus after the COVID-19 pandemic. In 2021 and 2022, the park performed a fountain and light show instead. The show has not performed since 2019 for unknown reasons.

== Apparatus ==
=== Fountains ===
The 2013 show was designed in consultation with Crystal Fountains, which supplied products including a sequencing fountain and a programmable fountain effect which can move in different directions. For the 2019 season, the Royal Fountain underwent a mechanical reconstruction of the pumps and control infrastructure. This included removing the Hydra constants and upgrading to a modern variable frequency drive (VFD) to precisely control the water jets and create new effects.

The fountain lighting effects are produced by 500 LED lights submerged in the Royal Fountain. Each of the Royal Fountain's 400 water jets has two to three RGBW lighting elements.

The unique control system is patented by the Canada's Wonderland Company, and programmed using a grandMA 1 lighting desk.

=== Lighting ===
In 2013, 20 Chauvet Legend fixtures were installed around the International Street area. 10 were placed on Wonder Mountain, 8 were placed on the railings on either side the Royal Fountain, and 2 were placed under the bridge crossing the fountain pool. In 2018, the 2 searchlights under the bridge were removed. In 2019, the 2 searchlights at the top of the mountain were removed, and the 8 railing searchlights were moved into poles because they wouldn't work on the railings when the fountain is turned into Snowflake Lake during WinterFest. In 2023, around 4 more of the searchlights were removed from Wonder Mountain, and lasers are no longer installed

In 2017, two KVANT Spectrum 20 lasers were installed on the mountain 27 metres (90 ft) above ground level. They seemingly get removed every year between seasons.

=== Projectors ===
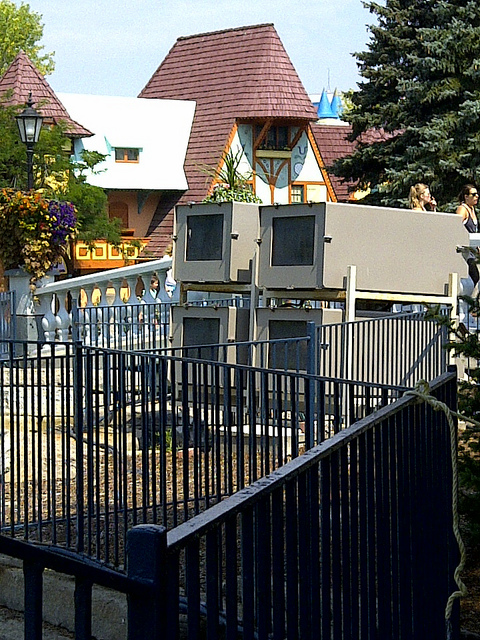
The four projectors that are used during the Starlight Spectacular show.

The Starlight Spectacular show uses four Christie Roadster S+20K 3-chip Digital Light Processing (DLP) projectors located just in front of the bridge that crosses the fountain pool. For unknown reasons, these projectors were removed in 2021, possibly due to a refurbishment.

=== Sound systems ===
Audio units placed along International Street provide sound comparable to a concert audio system, designed to maximize audio levels within the area. As of 2019, the International Street sound system consists of 16 QSC AD-S82H units on the top of each building along the street. This was an upgrade from the 1997 sound system of 10 EV X array audio stacks with sub-woofers.

The 1997 sound system had been installed for the pyrotechnic show "The Erruption" (1998–2001). When this show was closed (due to the cost of liquid propane for flame effects), the sound system was mainly used for diving shows and special events, in addition to the background park music.

Sound for the 2011–2013 seasons was designed by Tantrum and featured original music from Apollo Studios in Montreal. PM Audio provided sound design from the 2013 season. Audio was designed internally from 2014.
