= Devia =

Devia may refer to:

- Devia (plant), a genus of plants in the family Iridaceae
- Devia (beetle), a genus of rove beetles in the family Staphylinidae
- Mariella Devia, an Italian operatic soprano

See also:

- De'VIA, a visual arts genre
