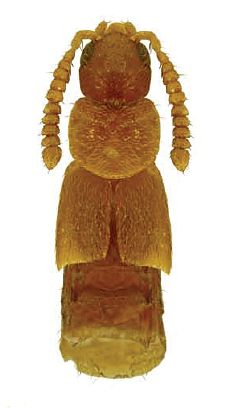

Scientific classification
- Kingdom: Animalia
- Phylum: Arthropoda
- Class: Insecta
- Order: Coleoptera
- Suborder: Polyphaga
- Infraorder: Staphyliniformia
- Family: Staphylinidae
- Genus: Alisalia
- Species: A. austiniana

Binomial name
- Alisalia austiniana Casey, 1911

= Alisalia austiniana =

Species of beetle

Alisalia austiniana is a species of rove beetle in the family Staphylinidae. It is found in North America.
