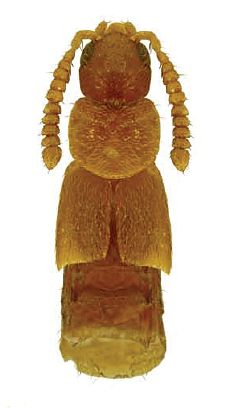
- Alisalia austiniana

Scientific classification
- Kingdom: Animalia
- Phylum: Arthropoda
- Class: Insecta
- Order: Coleoptera
- Suborder: Polyphaga
- Infraorder: Staphyliniformia
- Family: Staphylinidae
- Tribe: Oxypodini
- Genus: Alisalia; Casey, 1911

= Alisalia =

Genus of beetles

Alisalia is a genus of rove beetles in the family Staphylinidae. There are 10 described species in Alisalia.

== Species ==
These 10 species belong to the genus Alisalia:

- Alisalia antennalis Casey, 1911
- Alisalia austiniana Casey, 1911
- Alisalia bistriata (Bernhauer, 1909)
- Alisalia brevipennis Casey, 1911
- Alisalia brunnea Cameron, 1922
- Alisalia delicata Casey, 1911
- Alisalia elongata Klimaszewski & Webster, 2009
- Alisalia minuta Klimaszewski & Webster, 2009
- Alisalia parallela Casey, 1911
- Alisalia picea Cameron, 1922
- Alisalia testacea Casey, 1911
