= Commemorative banknotes of the Canadian dollar =

Four banknotes of the Canadian dollar have been commemorative issues. The first was issued in 1935 to the silver jubilee of the accession of George V to the throne of the United Kingdom, the only $25 banknote ever issued by the Bank of Canada. The second commemorative banknote was the Centennial $1 banknote issued in January 1967 to commemorate the Canadian Centennial. The third was issued in September 2015 to commemorate Elizabeth II becoming the longest-reigning monarch of the United Kingdom and Canada. In 2017, the Bank of Canada released a commemorative $10 banknote for Canada's sesquicentennial, which was available by Canada Day.

== Silver Jubilee of the accession of George V to the throne ==
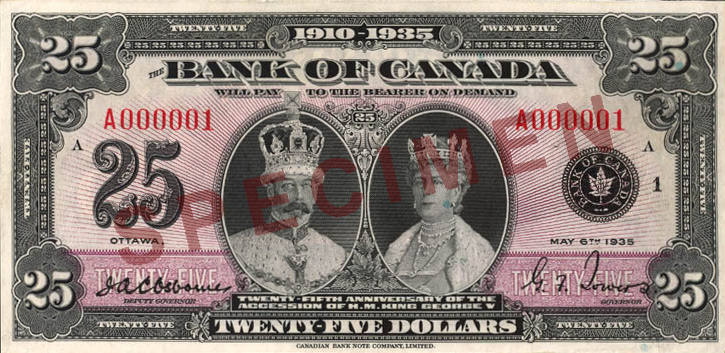
The obverse of the English-language version of the $25 banknote. The portraits are of George V on the left and Mary of Teck on the right.

The first commemorative banknote issued by the Bank of Canada was a $25 banknote in the 1935 series to commemorate the Silver Jubilee of the accession of George V to the throne. The royal purple banknote was issued on 6 May 1935, and is the only $25 banknote issued by the Bank of Canada.

On the obverse are the portraits of George V and Mary of Teck from an engraving by Will Ford and master engraver Edwin Gunn of the American Bank Note Company (ABN). The scene on the reverse depicts Windsor Castle, the official residence of the Royal family, from an engraving by Louis Delmoce of ABN.

The banknote includes the signatures of Graham Towers, the governor of the Bank of Canada, and J.A.C. Osborne, the deputy governor.

== Centennial $1 banknote ==
The obverse (top) and reverse (bottom) of the Canadian Centennial $1 banknote, version with regular serial numbers.
The obverse (top) and reverse (bottom) of the Canadian Centennial $1 banknote, version with dates.

On 3 January 1967, a $1 note commemorating the centennial of Canadian Confederation was introduced into circulation. The Bank of Canada stopped issuing the commemorative note in 1968.

The frames of both the obverse and reverse were based on the original $1 banknote of the 1954 series, modified to include the texts "Le centenaire de la confederation Canadienne" and "Centennial of Canadian Confederation", with English text at the top of the obverse and bottom of the reverse, and French text at the bottom of the obverse and top of the reverse.

On the left side of the obverse is a monochrome green adaptation of the stylized maple leaf used as the Canadian Centennial logo, marked with the years 1867 and 1967. The portrait is of an engraving of Elizabeth II adapted from a 1951 photograph by photographer Yousuf Karsh, but with the tiara she was wearing removed. The reverse depicts the original Centre Block of the parliament buildings, which were destroyed by fire in 1916, derived from the same engraving used for a Dominion of Canada banknote designed and printed in the 19th century.

There are two variants of the banknote printed. The first includes the serial number below the top of the frame on the obverse, whereas the more common second variant substitutes the years 1867 and 1967 in place of the serial numbers. The version without the serial number was "intended to appeal to note collectors".

== 2015 commemorative $20 banknote ==
The obverse (top) and reverse (bottom) of the banknotes commemorating Elizabeth II becoming the longest-reigning monarch of the United Kingdom and Canada.

On 9 September 2015, the Bank of Canada released a banknote to commemorate Elizabeth II becoming the longest-reigning monarch of the United Kingdom and Canada. The banknote was revealed at a ceremony at Rideau Hall by David Johnston, the governor general of Canada.

It is part of the Frontier series of polymer banknotes and is a modified version of the standard $20 banknote of that issue. On the commemorative banknote, the images on the metallic foil are a portrait of Elizabeth II adapted from a 1951 photograph by photographer Yousuf Karsh at the top, and the royal cypher of Elizabeth II at the bottom. This is the same portrait used for all 1954 Series banknotes and the centennial $1 banknote, but it retains the tiara, making this banknote the first Canadian banknote to depict Elizabeth II wearing a tiara.

== 2017 commemorative $10 banknote ==
A commemorative 10 dollar banknote, with a circulation of 50 million, was issued for Canada's 150th anniversary on 1 June 2017. It is of the same polymer material and purple colour of the standard Frontier series $10 banknote, but contains a unique design that includes four portraits of important historical Canadian figures.

The obverse features four portraits: John A. Macdonald, George-Étienne Cartier, Agnes Macphail, and James Gladstone, and the 'Canada 150' logo at upper right. The reverse has five landscapes: The Lions and Capilano Lake; fields of Prairie wheat; the Canadian Shield in Quebec; the Atlantic coast at Cape Bonavista; and northern lights in Wood Buffalo National Park. The holographic window includes the national coat of arms, and a representation of the artwork Owl's Bouquet by Inuk artist Kenojuak Ashevak.
