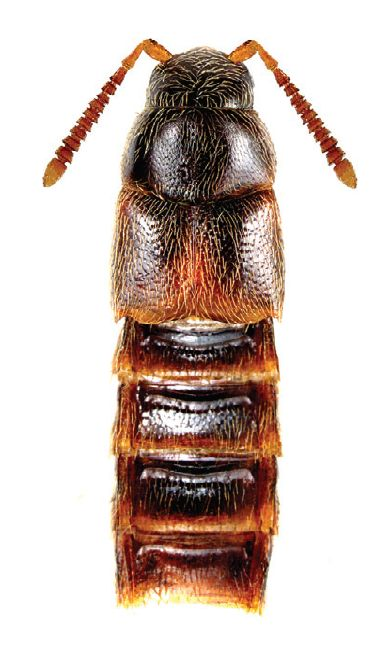
- Crataraea suturalis

Scientific classification
- Kingdom: Animalia
- Phylum: Arthropoda
- Class: Insecta
- Order: Coleoptera
- Suborder: Polyphaga
- Infraorder: Staphyliniformia
- Family: Staphylinidae
- Tribe: Oxypodini
- Genus: Crataraea; Thomson, 1858

= Crataraea =

Genus of beetles

Crataraea is a genus of rove beetles in the family Staphylinidae. There is at least one described species in Crataraea, C. suturalis.

There is potentially a second species in this genus, Crataraea grandiceps, a preserved specimen at the Smithsonian National Museum of Natural History.
