= 150th anniversary of Canada =

Sesquicentennial anniversary of Canadian Confederation

Official emblem of Canada 150, a stylized maple leaf with 13 diamonds representing provinces and territories. The four red diamonds represent provinces at confederation

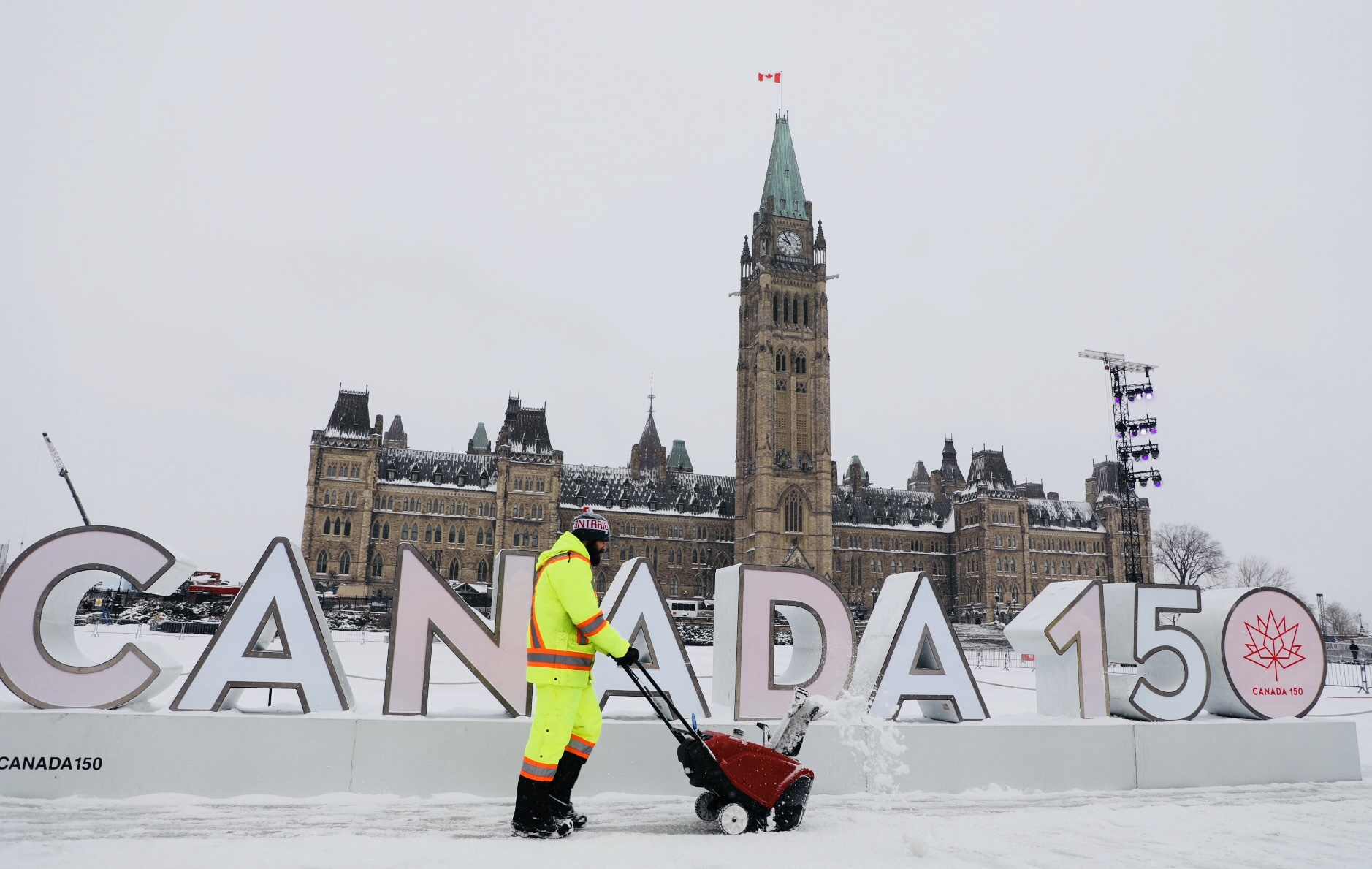
Canada 150 at Parliament Hill

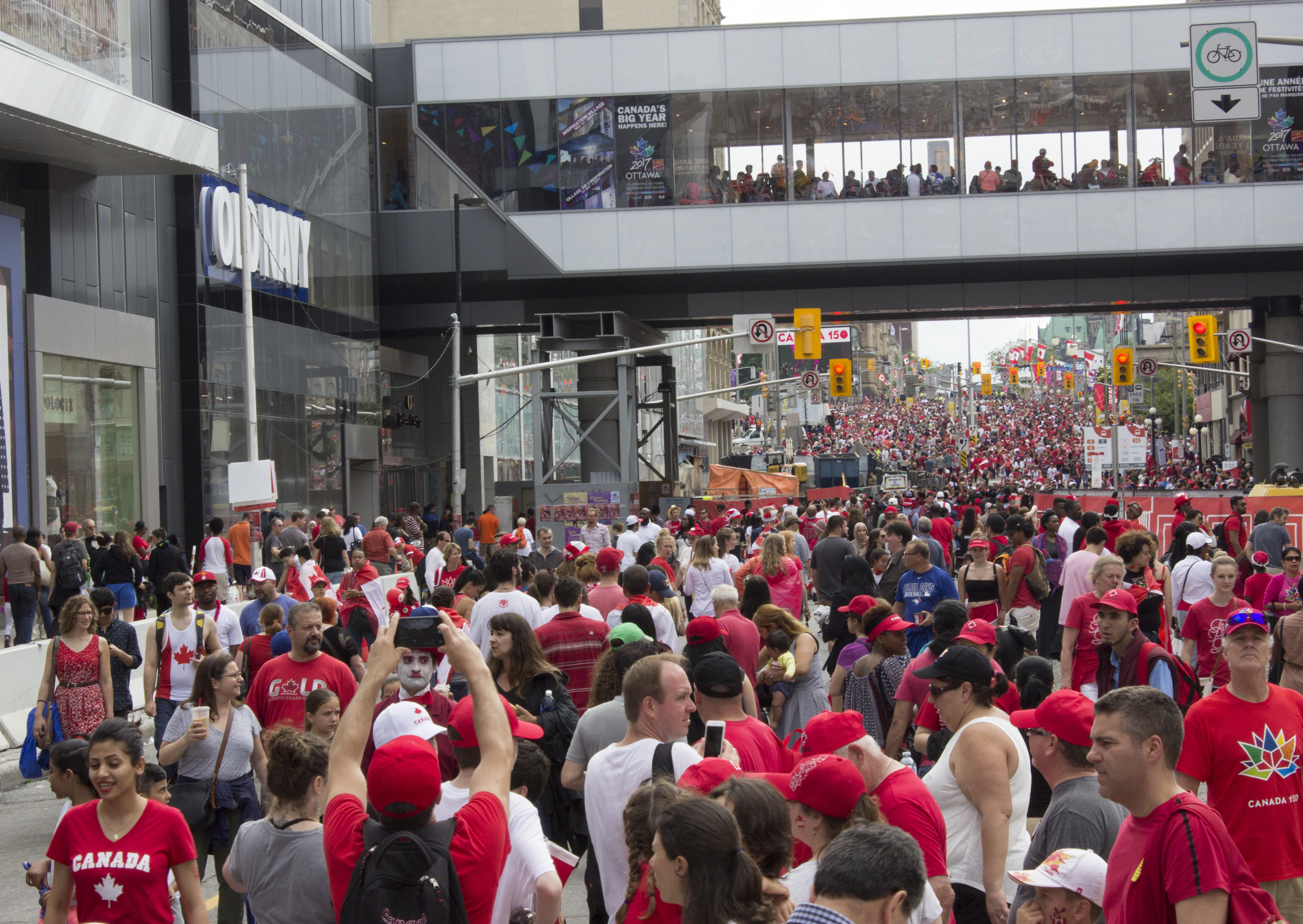
Canada 150 celebrations in Ottawa

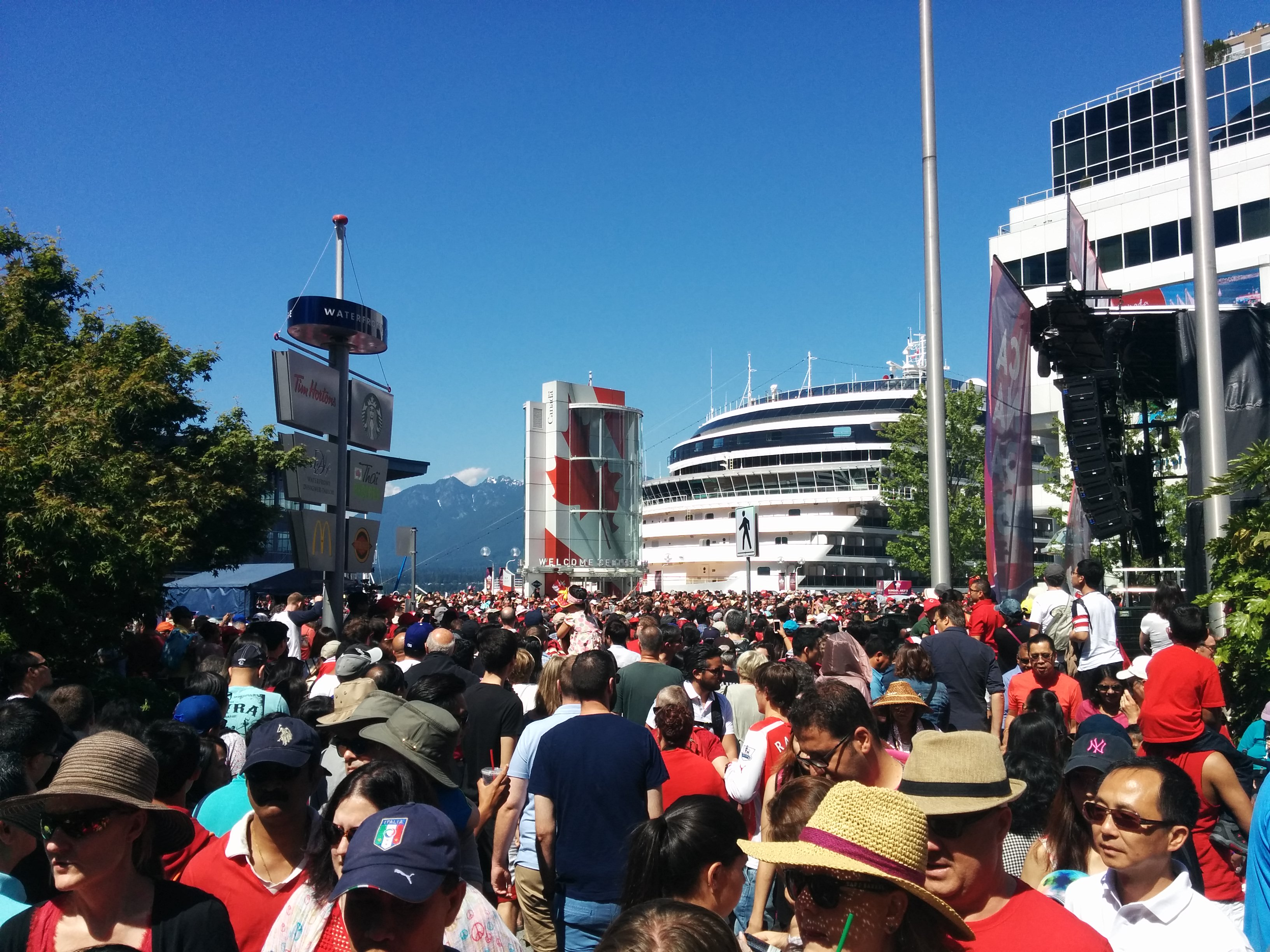
Canada 150 celebrations at Canada Place in Vancouver, the largest event outside of Ottawa

The 150th anniversary of Canada, also known as the 150th anniversary of Confederation and promoted by the Canadian government as Canada 150, occurred in 2017 as Canada marked the sesquicentennial of Canadian Confederation.

== Planning ==
Major planning for the anniversary celebration began in 2010. The Institute of Public Administration of Canada held a conference called 150!Canada bringing together public servants, business leaders, and non-governmental organizations at the National Arts Centre in Ottawa on March 11 and 12, 2010. More than 300 delegates heard from 25 speakers, with the goal of developing an action to celebrate Canada's sesquicentennial.

The 150Alliance was established as a national network of groups with a goal to encourage communities and organizations to organize their own Canada 150 events. It held its first meeting in Ottawa on January 23, 2015.

=== Medal ===
As had been done in 1867, 1927, 1967, and 1992, a medal for the milestone anniversary of Confederation in 2017 was originally planned by Minister of Canadian Heritage Shelly Glover. She was succeeded in that office in 2015 by Melanie Joly, who received detailed information on the medal project up to that point, including a rendering of the design, prepared medal certificates, and drafted regulations and letters patent for Queen Elizabeth II's signature. However, Joly cancelled the medal in 2016, without stated reason.

The Senate commissioned the Royal Canadian Mint to cast honorary medallions commemorating the 150th anniversary of the upper chamber's first sitting. These were awarded to "Canadians or permanent residents actively involved in their communities who, through generosity, dedication, volunteerism, and hard work make their hometowns, communities, regions, provinces, or territories a better place to live." The honorary medallions, however, are not part of the Canadian honours system.

== Federal initiatives ==
=== Funding ===
The Canadian federal Government announced it would be spending an estimated half-billion dollars on 150th-anniversary events and projects. $300-million was to be spent by Canadian regional development agencies through a Canada 150 Community Infrastructure Program. The fund was set up by the ministry headed by Stephen Harper and originally assigned a $150-million budget prior to the 2015 Canadian federal election. The new Liberal ministry under Justin Trudeau doubled the program's size in its first budget.

$40-million for cultural projects was funded by the Canada Council for the Arts under its "New Chapter" program. The Social Sciences and Humanities Research Council also set up a grant program entitled Canada 150 Connection to support activities by post-secondary institutions and researchers that explore the contributions of social sciences and humanities research to Canadian society.

Some projects were given special recognition under the designation "Signature Projects" as "large-scale, participation-oriented activities, of national scope and with high impact". One of the projects with the highest profiles was the Canada C3 Expedition, a 5-month sailing cruise around Canada aboard the icebreaker Canada C3.

=== Logo ===
The official emblem of the sesquicentennial was designed by Ariana Cuvin, a then-19-year-old student in the University of Waterloo's global business and digital arts program. It consists of 13 multi-coloured diamonds forming a maple leaf; Cuvin stated that the four diamonds forming the emblem's base represented Canada's four original provinces, while the others represented the provinces and territories that had joined since. The government described the emblem as reflecting Canada's unity and diversity. The emblem was chosen through a competition held by the government, and open to post-secondary students. The logo contains several stylized items within itself such as: a tulip, an aboriginal stone spear, a ship and the Fleur de Lis. These items were occasionally displayed on the background of the stage during the Canada Day festivities on Parliament Hill.

The emblem received mixed reviews from the professional community; two designers interviewed by the Ottawa Citizen panned the logo for being the "minimum" of a usable logo and "student work" respectively, but another remarked that it was a "strong and simple design that should hold up well in all applications". The contest was criticized by the Society of Graphic Designers of Canada, which believed that the contest was "unethical" and "exploited" students, and expressed dissatisfaction over the fact that the contest was not open to design professionals. Cuvin, who received a prize of $5,000 for winning the contest, told the Ottawa Citizen that she did not feel that she was being exploited.

Type designer Ray Larabie donated Mesmerize, a geometric sans-serif typeface from his freeware collection, to the government of Canada to serve as the official typeface for the festivities, adding as many of the characters from Canada's indigenous languages as he could. The resulting font was named "Canada 150." Larabie released a further expansion of that type, "Canada1500," into the public domain, when the festivities ended.

=== Commemorative currency ===
The Bank of Canada released a commemorative $10 banknote for Canada's sesquicentennial, which was broadly available by Canada Day.

The Royal Canadian Mint held a national contest titled My Canada, My Inspiration for the design of the reverses of each of five circulating coins of the Canadian dollar, which would be part of the "Canada 150 Collection". Each coin had an associated theme. On November 2, 2016, it held an unveiling ceremony in the communities of each of the winners, selected by an online vote in September 2015. The winners received a trip to Ottawa, $2000 in cash, and a special edition set of the coins.

Coin	Theme	Designer	Title	Notes
Toonie	Our Wonders	Stephen and Timothy Hsia	Dance of the Spirits	10 million produced
Loonie	Our Achievements	Wesley Klassen	Connecting a Nation	10 million produced
Quarter	Canada's Future	Joelle Wong	Hope for a Green Future	20 million produced
Dime	Our Character	Amy Choi	Wings of Peace	20 million produced
Nickel	Our Passions	Gerald Gloade	Living Traditions	20 million produced

The Royal Canadian Mint also produced commemorative coins, including a 2-troy-ounce (62 g) matte proof-finish silver coin with a face value of $10, a 2017 variant based on the Silver Maple Leaf coin. It expects to release about fifty commemorative and circulating coin products, including Brilliant Uncirculated sets.

=== Commemorative stamps ===
All stamps produced by Canada Post during 2017 included references to the sesquicentennial.

=== National parks ===
Parks Canada announced it would give away free passes to Canada's national parks, historic sites and marine conservation areas. The passes were available at Parks Canada sites and through partners until the end of 2017.

=== Official flower ===
The Canada 150 tulip, also known as the Maple Leaf tulip, is the official tulip of Canada 150 and was unveiled May 9, 2016, in Commissioners Park. The tulip was selectively bred with white flower and red flames, which resembles the flag of Canada. For Canada 150, the Canadian Tulip Festival in Ottawa planted 30,000 Maple Leaf tulip bulbs.

== National cultural initiatives ==
Queen Elizabeth II, Canada's sovereign, offered her best wishes and congratulations on the 150th anniversary of Confederation in a recorded message, released on January 1, 2017. Her son and heir-apparent, Prince Charles (now Charles III), and his wife, the Duchess of Cornwall (now Queen Camilla), toured Nunavut and Ontario before attending the national celebration in Ottawa on July 1.

A Canada 150 Mosaic project will see in 150 interconnected murals created across the country, depicting a train travelling coast-to-coast across Canada. Each mural will be made up of hundreds of tiles painted by individual Canadians. Roughly 100,000 individuals are expected to take part.

Throughout the year, the Canada On Screen series was jointly presented by the TIFF Bell Lightbox in Toronto, The Cinematheque in Vancouver, Library and Archives Canada in Ottawa and the Cinémathèque québécoise in Montreal, offering free screenings of 150 works from throughout the history of Canadian cinema.

On February 20, 2017, the National Film Board of Canada (NFB) launched a four-part online series entitled 1 Nation. 4 Lenses, exploring Canadian stories through films from the NFB collection. The first chapter, What We Call Home, examines how Canadians define home. Subsequent chapters are What We Protect (launching April), What We Seek (June) and What We Fight For (September). It also published Legacies 150—a series of 13 interactive essays on themes of legacy and inheritance.

On April 19, National Canadian Film Day 150 showcased Canadian films on television, online as well as at more than 600 cinemas, libraries and public venues in close to 200 communities across the country.

Lost Stories was inaugurated as an online film project initiated by Concordia University history professor Ronald Rudin, documenting unusual stories from Canadian history. Started in Montreal as a pilot project by Rudin, co-director of the Centre for Oral History and Digital Storytelling at Concordia, Lost Stories was elevated to a national initiative, with $235,000 in Canada 150 funding from the Department of Canadian Heritage.

The University of Alberta also launched a digital content hub to mark Canada's 150th birthday with stories, images, videos and featured events, as well as experts who will address topics such as Canada's constitution, Canadian literature, Indigenous issues, wildlife conservation and climate change.

CTV created and aired the documentary film Canada in a Day, in which director Trish Dolman selected footage from over 16,000 videos submitted by Canadians to present a portrait of 24 hours in the life of Canada.

== Criticism ==
Some indigenous people criticised the Canada 150 celebrations for ignoring indigenous history and downplaying the contemporary hardships faced by aboriginals. Others criticised the amount of money the Canadian government spent on the celebrations.

== Regional projects ==
=== British Columbia ===
British Columbia established a funding program "to celebrate B.C. communities and their contribution to Canada," with $8 million invested in museums and heritage sites throughout the province.

As part of an effort to recognize the Indigenous population of the region that had lived there since prior to colonialization, Vancouver's celebrations of the sesquicentennial were branded as Canada 150+ with the slogan "Moving Forward Together". The city organized three "signature" events in partnership with Reconciliation Canada to highlight Vancouver's First Nations communities, including The Drum is Calling Festival at Larwill Park, the Gathering of Canoes at Jericho Beach, and the Walk for Reconciliation in September 2017.

=== New Brunswick ===
The New Brunswick government launched a website, canada150nb.ca, to promote events and celebrate New Brunswick pride as part of Canada's 150th anniversary. The website includes marketing tools to help community groups promote their Canada 150 events. The website also invites the public to submit their own video clips and photos of the province.

=== Newfoundland and Labrador ===
The Newfoundland Insectarium and Butterfly Garden will be updating their exhibits and making them bilingual. These changes were put in place to celebrate the unity of Canada 150 and the influx of Franco-Canadian tourists to the island of Newfoundland in the recent years.

=== Nova Scotia ===
The province's 150 Forward Fund provides funding for organizations to help Nova Scotians celebrate Canada 150, with events or programs that honour Nova Scotian achievements, celebrate the province's cultural identity and diversity, or recognize innovation over the past 150 years. Communities, Culture and Heritage Minister Tony Ince announced January 30 that 39 non-profit enterprises and co-operatives had been awarded a total of $841,000 through the first round of grants. A second round of applications runs until February 28. Canada 150 celebrations in Nova Scotia will also include Rendez-Vous 2017, which will see tall ships visit 11 communities across the province over the summer.

=== Ontario ===
The province of Ontario spent $7 million to support more than 350 Canada 150 events across the province. It opted to create its own Ontario 150 anniversary logo, or wordmark, at a cost of $30,000. It was criticized for featuring a giant rubber duck as part of the celebration, with one critic saying, "It's an absurd waste of taxpayers' dollars."

==== Niagara Falls ====
Niagara Falls officially launched its Canada 150 activities at a flag raising ceremony on January 27, with former Toronto Maple Leaf Johnny Bower in attendance. The city had allocated $150,000 for Canada 150 events.

==== Ottawa ====
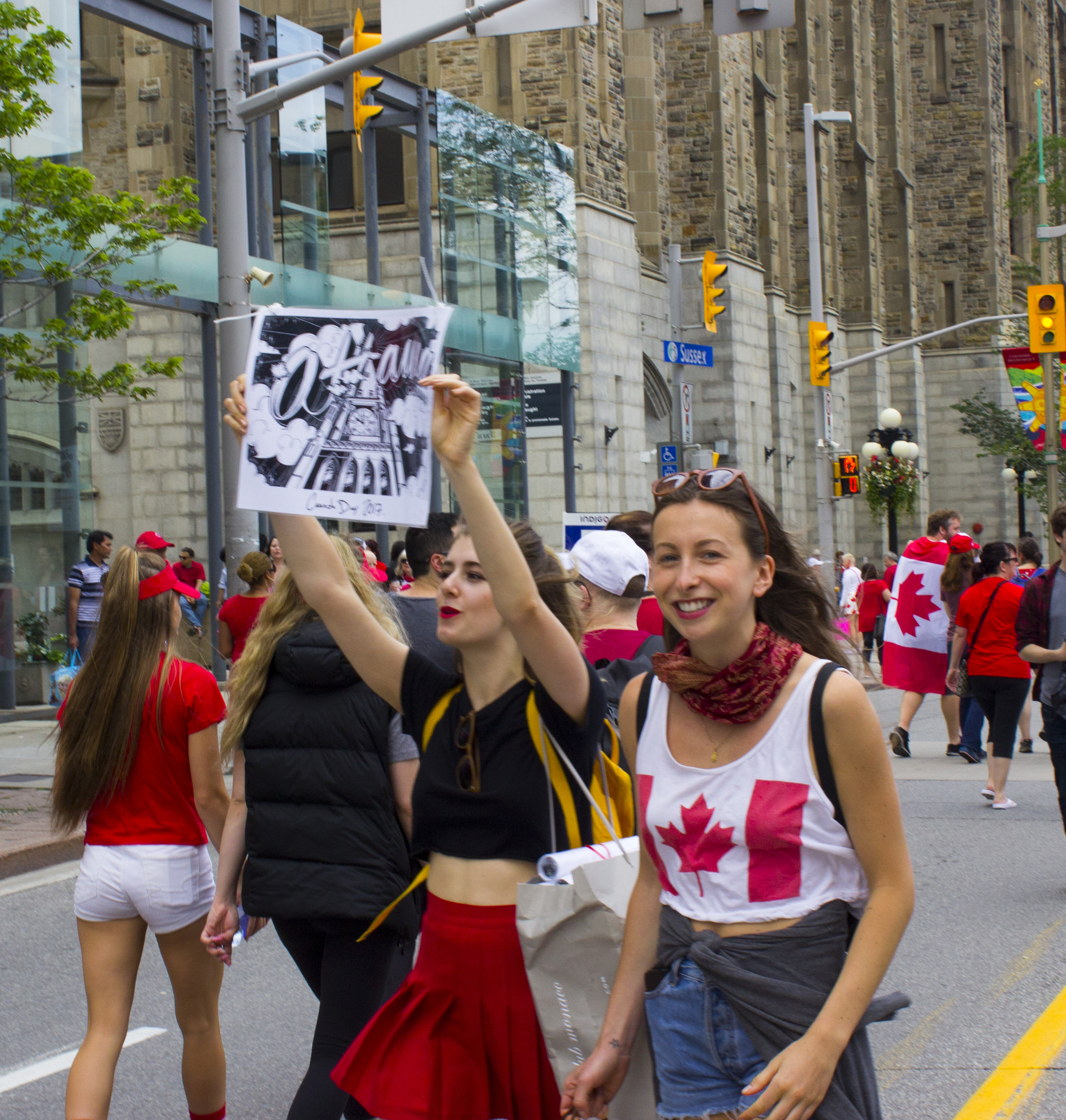
Young women promote local artistic depictions of Ottawa 2017 during Canada 150 celebrations in Ottawa.

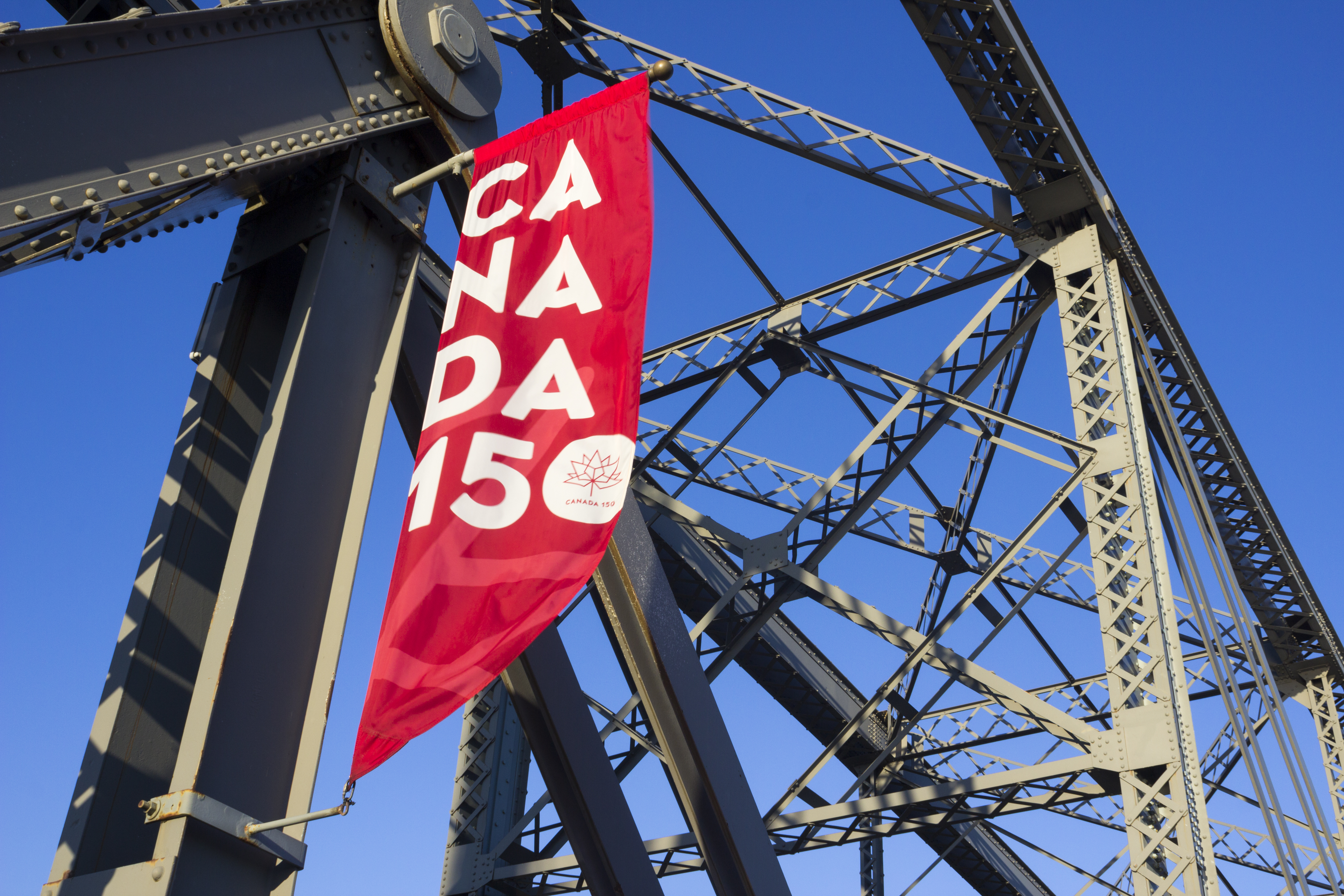
Canada 150 Street Banner on the Alexandra Bridge in Ottawa, Ontario, Canada.

Canada's capital of Ottawa is home to a vast number of events during the sesquicentennial under the banner "Ottawa 2017".

The 2017 Juno Awards, took place March 27 – April 2 at the Canadian Tire Centre in the city's west end. The awards were hosted by Bryan Adams and Russell Peters, who replaced singer Michael Bublé, who had to drop out because his son had cancer.

During the summer, an interactive area promoting Canada called Inspiration Village was created in the Byward Market. Talks from inspirational speakers and other performances were held in an amphitheatre, and workshops and exhibits were hosted by the different provinces and territories within converted cargo containers. The word "Ottawa" was displayed in large 3-D letters that visitors could climb upon. At the end of July, La Machine, an enormous urban street theatre production from France made its North American debut. The production involved large marionettes and street performers travelling through the Byward Market area and other downtown streets.

Ottawa hosted several notable sporting events in 2017, including the 2017 Canadian Olympic Curling Trials, the 2017 Canadian Track and Field Championships, and the 2017 Red Bull Crashed Ice World Championship (with a course built along the Rideau Canal beside the Chateau Laurier). Ottawa's TD Place Stadium hosted the 105th Grey Cup (the 2017 championship game of the Canadian Football League), as well as two outdoor ice hockey games; the NHL 100 Classic (an outdoor National Hockey League game between the Ottawa Senators and Montreal Canadiens, which additionally celebrated the league's centennial year), and a Canadian Hockey League interleague game between the Ottawa 67's of the Ontario Hockey League (a team which was established in the year of Canada's centennial and named in its honour) and the Gatineau Olympiques of the Quebec Major Junior Hockey League (QMJHL).

==== Toronto ====
The City of Toronto's TO Canada with Love (the TO referring to the city's nickname, T.O.) is the year-long program of events related to the 150th anniversary of Canada. The city's iconic 3D Toronto sign was fitted with a large illuminated 3-D structure of a maple leaf prior to 2017 at the end of the sign.

Canada Mosaic is a cross-country celebration of Canadian music and musicians administered by the Toronto Symphony Orchestra, with $7.5 million in funding from the government of Canada. The program will involve 40 orchestras and as many as 60 new commissions. Canada Mosaic had its first performance January 21 at Roy Thompson Hall in Toronto, with conductors Alain Trudel and Victor Feldbrill leading the TSO in works by John Weinzweig, Godfrey Ridout, Pierre Mercure, Jean Coulthard and André Mathieu. The concert began with a two-minute fanfare by Trudel – one of 40 such so-called "sesquies" commissioned by Canada Mosaic.

Hundreds of musicians were expected to perform together in Toronto to set a Guinness world record for the largest rock performance, by playing four as-yet-unannounced Canadian rock classics. Organizers of Canada Rocks 150 hoped to attract 1,500 musicians, which did not come to fruition.

The Toronto Blue Jays wore special red-and-white uniforms throughout the 2017 season, during Sunday games and other selected home games.

==== Windsor ====
Dubbed the Great Canadian Flag Project, Windsor, Ontario is erecting a 150-foot (45.7-metre) flagpole to fly a 60 feet by 30 feet (18 metres by nine metres) Canadian flag. Four upward-facing spotlights will illuminate the flag at night. A smaller 24 feet by 12 feet (7.3 metres by 3.7 metres) flag will fly during periods of strong winds. As of January 14, 2017, $300,000 has been raised for the project, including $150,000 from the federal government.

=== Quebec ===
Canada 150 in Quebec coincides with celebrations marking the 375th anniversary of Montreal, where notable projects include decorative lights for the Jacques Cartier Bridge and a new headquarters for the National Film Board of Canada in the Quartier des spectacles.

=== Northern Canada ===
A Canadian Arctic Aviation Tour will be a series of air shows across Canada's North, with plans to visit close to 100 northern communities. The tour will begin in June at Alberta's Rocky Mountain House Airport.

The Canada C3 was scheduled to sail through the Northwest Passage, visiting many northern Aboriginal communities along the way, during the summer of 2017.

== International responses ==
To celebrate Canada's 150th anniversary, the Glasgow Film Festival (Feb 15–26) has selected a program entitled "True North: New Canadian Cinema." Films include Weirdos by Bruce McDonald, who is scheduled to attend the festival, along with Werewolf by Ashley McKenzie, Old Stone by Johnny Ma, Below Her Mouth by April Mullen and Hello Destroyer by Kevan Funk.

== Other activities ==
In January 2017, the journal G3: Genes, Genomes, Genetics published a paper by molecular researchers from The Hospital for Sick Children in Toronto who had sequenced the genome of Castor canadensis (North American beaver) to celebrate the sesquicentennial.

In May 2017, a newly identified species of beetle (Apimela canadensis), first discovered in New Brunswick, was named in celebration of Canada'a 150th anniversary.

In June 2017, the Bank of Canada issued a Canadian ten-dollar note commemorative design, celebrating the 150th anniversary of the confederation of Canada featuring John A. Macdonald, George-Étienne Cartier, Agnes MacPhail and James Gladstone.

== See also ==
- Canadian Centennial, 100th anniversary (1967)
