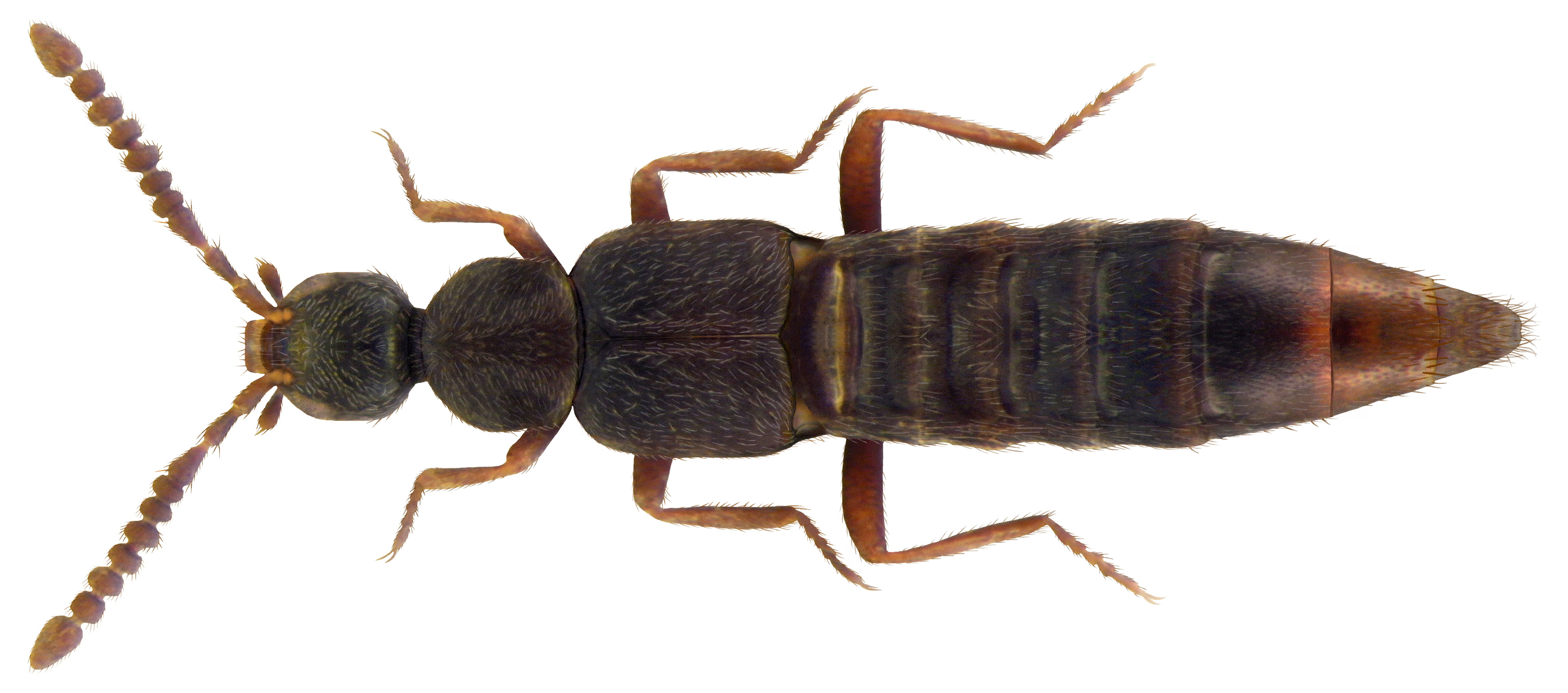
- Calodera aethiops 2-2,5 mm

Scientific classification
- Domain: Eukaryota
- Kingdom: Animalia
- Phylum: Arthropoda
- Class: Insecta
- Order: Coleoptera
- Suborder: Polyphaga
- Infraorder: Staphyliniformia
- Family: Staphylinidae
- Genus: Calodera
- Species: C. aethiops

Binomial name
- Calodera aethiops Gravenhorst, 1802

= Calodera aethiops =

Species of beetle

Calodera aethiops is a species of rove beetles native to Europe.
