= Sequencing fountain =

A sequencing fountain is an ornamental fountain that cycles through a series of patterns of water flow under the control of a programmable control unit. They are typically installed in city centres and shopping malls as well as smaller-scale domestic applications.

== History ==
While fountains have existed since antiquity, programmable choreography in fountains is a development of the late 19th century. During the 20th century, a variety of technology was developed to enhance the programmability of water features and fountains. One such development is the sequencing device. Sequencing devices achieve fast and smooth water sequencing effects within a large water feature. A solenoid device can produce sequencing effects of up to 10x per second at high switching speeds with no water hammer.

== How used ==
Over the past number of years fountain designers have been experimenting with interactive water features enticing the viewer in to participate. Fountains that entertain and are choreographed with music and color-changing lights have become more popular.

== Switching devices ==
Decorative fountain systems employ fluid amplifiers to generate their decorative displays and effects. Fluid amplifiers rely on a fluid control stream to switch a fluid power stream. Fluid amplifiers are so named because a low-energy fluid control signal can control and switch a high-energy fluid power stream to produce an output signal of higher energy level than the fluid control signal. In fluid amplifiers, a fluid power stream, after leaving a nozzle, is switched selectively to one or more of a plurality of outlet passages. This may be done by supplying fluid control pressure continuously, or as a pulse, to one of the control ports at the exit end of the nozzle until the high-energy power stream is diverted. Alternatively, switching may be effected by closing the other control port so that the fluid that is flowing in through one control port from the atmosphere or some other source will create a sufficient fluid pressure imbalance adjacent the exit end of the nozzle to effect switching of the fluid power stream.

In use, a fluid amplifier would typically be connected to, and receive the high-energy power stream from, a separate fluid supply manifold that had been previously installed.

Typical Installation for Fountains Typical Installation for Playdecks

== Where used ==
- White Square, Moscow, Russia
- Oasis and Allure of the Seas, AquaTheatre
- Town Lake, Austin, USA
- Easton Town Center, Columbus, USA
- Gateway Theatre of Shopping Boulevard Water Feature, Durban, South Africa
- Metropolitan Warsaw, Poland
- Kuala Lumpur City Centre Fountain, Kuala Lumpur, Malaysia
- Starlight Spectacular / Royal Fountain, Canada's Wonderland, Vaughan, Ontario, Canada
