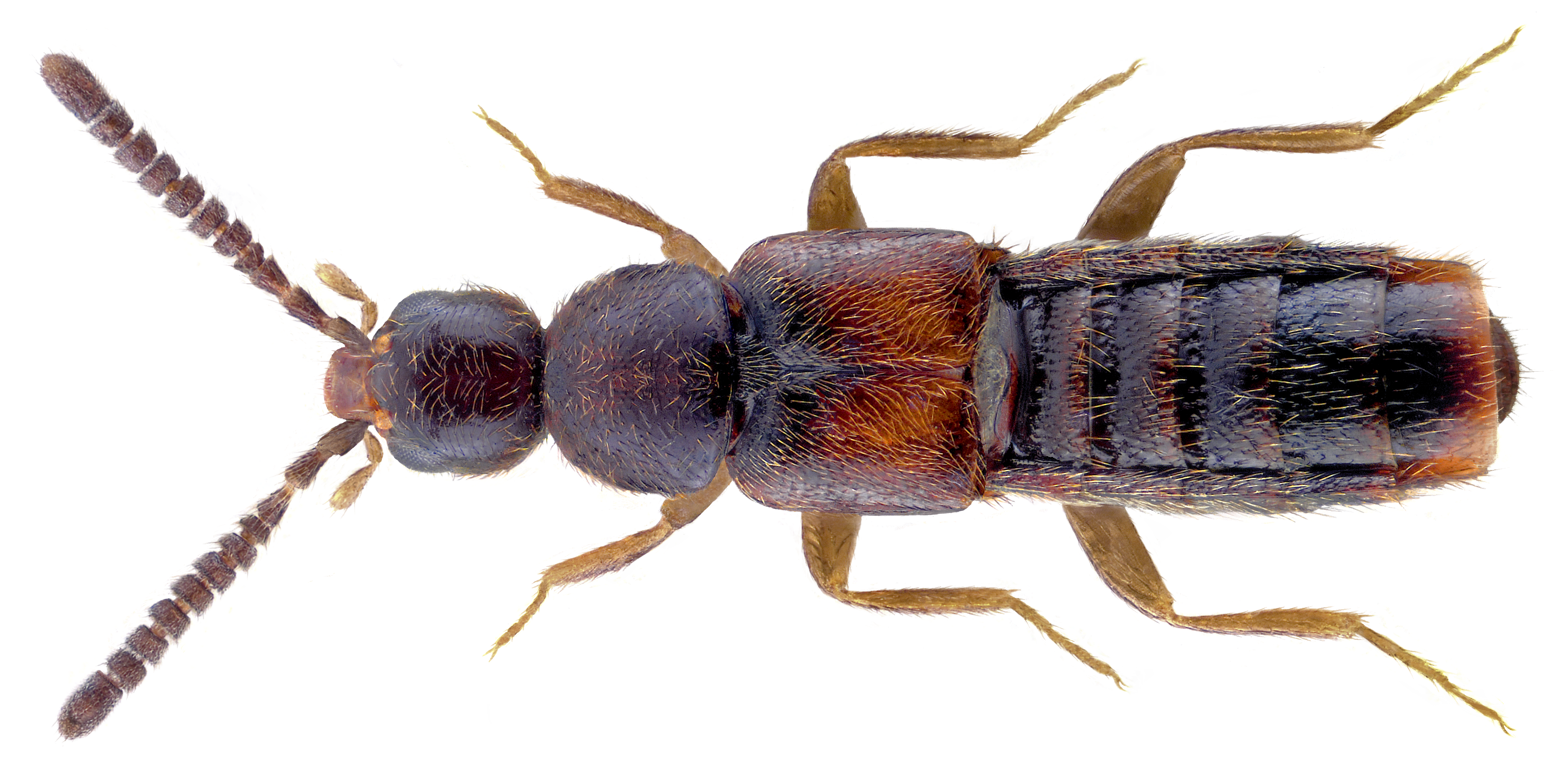
- Amarochara Umbrosa beetle

Scientific classification
- Domain: Eukaryota
- Kingdom: Animalia
- Phylum: Arthropoda
- Class: Insecta
- Order: Coleoptera
- Suborder: Polyphaga
- Infraorder: Staphyliniformia
- Family: Staphylinidae
- Tribe: Oxypodini
- Genus: Amarochara; Thomson, 1858

= Amarochara =

Genus of beetles

Amarochara is a genus of beetles belonging to the family Staphylinidae.

The genus was first described by Carl Gustaf Thomson in 1858.

The species of this genus are found in Europe and North America.

Species:

- Amarochara armata Assing, 2002
- Amarochara brevios Assing, 2002
- Amarochara caeca Assing, 2002
- Amarochara carina Assing, 2002
- Amarochara fenyesi Blatchley, 1910
- Amarochara forticornis (Lacordaire, 1835)
- Amarochara heterogaster Cameron, 1939
- Amarochara inermis Assing, 2002
- Amarochara inquilina (Casey, 1906)
- Amarochara sororcula Cameron, 1939
- Amarochara umbrosa (Erichson, 1837)
