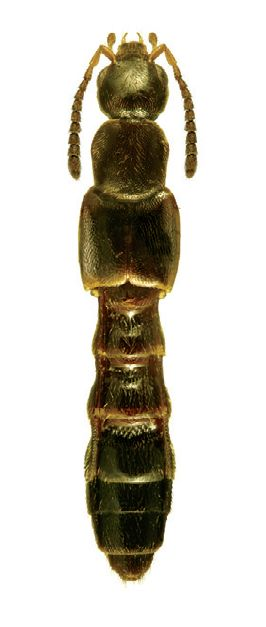

Scientific classification
- Kingdom: Animalia
- Phylum: Arthropoda
- Class: Insecta
- Order: Coleoptera
- Suborder: Polyphaga
- Infraorder: Staphyliniformia
- Family: Staphylinidae
- Genus: Tachyusa
- Species: T. americana

Binomial name
- Tachyusa americana Casey, 1906

Synonyms
- Tachyusa meraca Casey, 1911; Tachyusa sylvatica Casey, 1911

= Tachyusa americana =

Species of beetle

Tachyusa americana is a species of rove beetle in the family Staphylinidae. It is found in North America.
