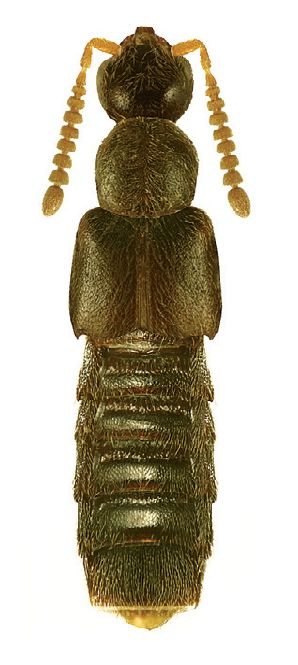
- Calodera parviceps

Scientific classification
- Domain: Eukaryota
- Kingdom: Animalia
- Phylum: Arthropoda
- Class: Insecta
- Order: Coleoptera
- Suborder: Polyphaga
- Infraorder: Staphyliniformia
- Family: Staphylinidae
- Subfamily: Aleocharinae
- Tribe: Oxypodini
- Genus: Calodera; Mannerheim, 1830

= Calodera =

Genus of beetles

Calodera is a genus of beetles belonging to the family Staphylinidae.

The genus was first described by Mannerheim in 1830.

The genus has cosmopolitan distribution.

Species:

- Calodera aethiops
- Calodera nigrita
- Calodera protensa
- Calodera riparia
- Calodera rubens
- Calodera rufescens
- Calodera uliginosa
