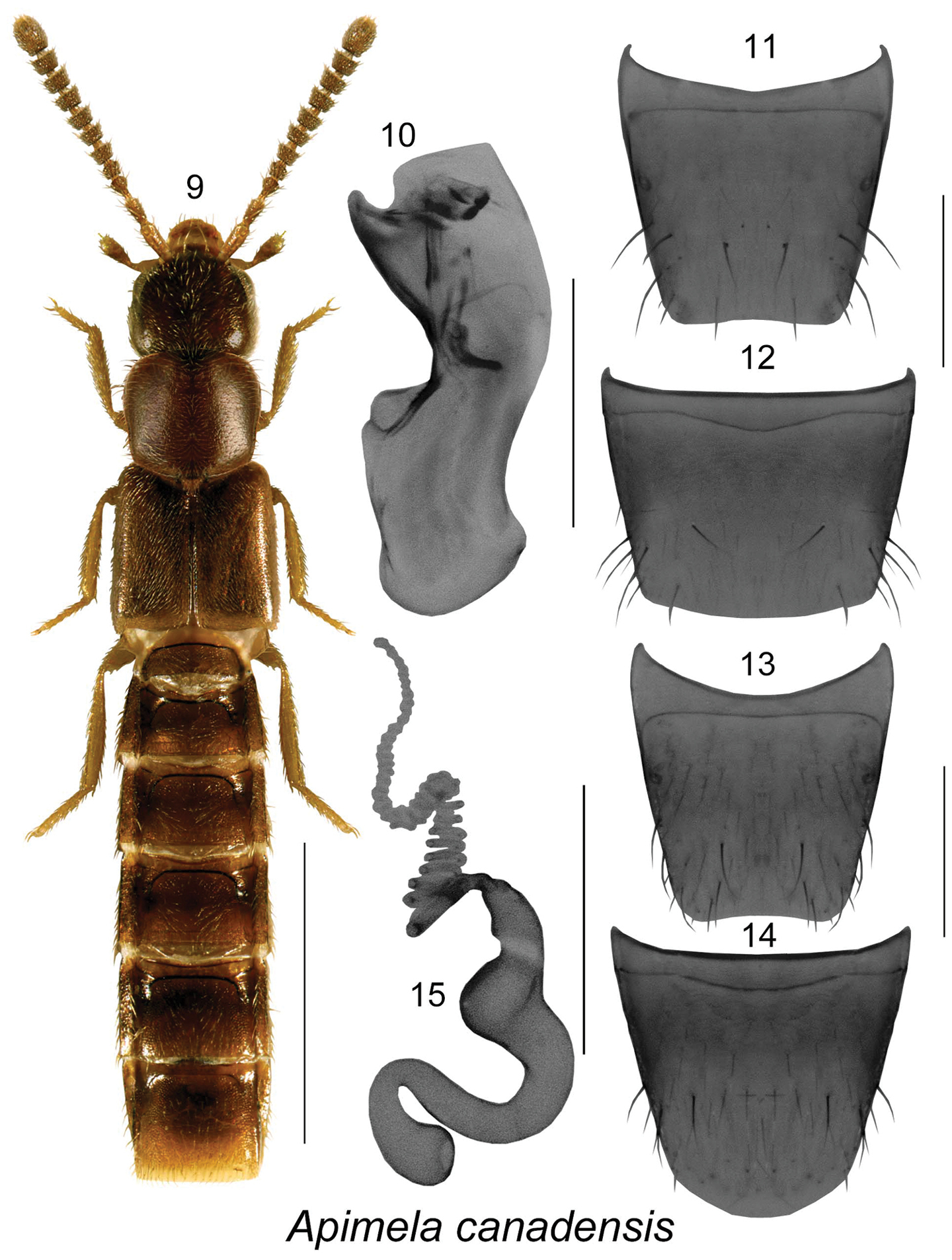

Scientific classification
- Domain: Eukaryota
- Kingdom: Animalia
- Phylum: Arthropoda
- Class: Insecta
- Order: Coleoptera
- Suborder: Polyphaga
- Infraorder: Staphyliniformia
- Family: Staphylinidae
- Subfamily: Aleocharinae
- Tribe: Oxypodini
- Genus: Apimela; Mulsant & Rey, 1873

= Apimela =

Genus of beetles

Apimela is a genus of beetles belonging to the family Staphylinidae.

There are currently 88 species in this genus found in Europe and America. Many of these species have been described in the 2000s and it is likely that more species await description.

== Species ==
- Apimela angkorensis Pace, 2004
- Apimela aptera Pace, 1992
- Apimela arcuata Pace, 2008
- Apimela argentina (Bernhauer, 1912)
- Apimela attenuata (Casey, 1885)
- Apimela auriculata Assing, 2020
- Apimela australiensis Pace, 2003
- Apimela baculata Assing, 2020
- Apimela basicauda Pace, 1999
- Apimela bilobata Assing, 2020
- Apimela boliviana Pace, 2009
- Apimela borneensis Pace, 2008
- Apimela canadensis Klimaszewski & Webster, 2017
- Apimela cargillegica Pace, 2016
- Apimela carnavonensis Pace, 2015
- Apimela castanea Pace, 1999
- Apimela chilensis Pace, 1987
- Apimela chinensis Pace, 1999
- Apimela confundibilis Pace, 2009
- Apimela consors Pace, 1992
- Apimela curticornis Pace, 2008
- Apimela errans Pace, 1990
- Apimela exiguides Newton, 2015
- Apimela fenyesi (Bernhauer, 1906)
- Apimela fusciceps (Casey, 1893)
- Apimela gabonensis Pace, 2009
- Apimela gingeriana Pace, 2016
- Apimela glarearum Pace, 2012
- Apimela gracilis Normand, 1935
- Apimela graeca Assing, 2020
- Apimela hartmanni (Pace, 2006)
- Apimela heteroclita Pace, 1996
- Apimela hova Pace, 1999
- Apimela indica (Cameron, 1939)
- Apimela jaegeri Pace, 2012
- Apimela jiajinensis Pace, 2012
- Apimela kayovensis Pace, 1996
- Apimela kinabaluicola Pace, 2008
- Apimela kirghisica Assing, 2020
- Apimela kirimirensis Pace, 1996
- Apimela lambirensis Pace, 2008
- Apimela lamellata Assing, 2020
- Apimela lineata (Casey, 1893)
- Apimela lineola (Kraatz, 1859)
- Apimela longicornis (Casey, 1911)
- Apimela longipennis (Casey, 1911)
- Apimela luorum Pace, 1996
- Apimela luteiventris Pace, 1990
- Apimela macella (Erichson, 1839)
- Apimela mahnerti Pace, 1996
- Apimela major Pace, 2008
- Apimela minima Pace, 2009
- Apimela morvani Pace, 1992
- Apimela mutata Assing, 2020
- Apimela nepalicola (Pace, 2006)
- Apimela newarica Pace, 1992
- Apimela obscuripennis Pace, 1999
- Apimela orousseti Pace, 1990
- Apimela pallescens (Cameron, 1939)
- Apimela papuana Pace, 2000
- Apimela papuanorum Pace, 2000
- Apimela paradoxa (Bernhauer, 1921)
- Apimela perarmata Pace, 2014
- Apimela perreti Pace, 1996
- Apimela persimilis (Cameron, 1939)
- Apimela plicata Pace, 2008
- Apimela prapatensis Pace, 1993
- Apimela procera Assing, 2019
- Apimela queenslandica Pace, 2015
- Apimela rangirensis Pace, 1996
- Apimela rougemonti Pace, 1992
- Apimela rufigaster Pace, 1999
- Apimela sabulicola (Bernhauer, 1914)
- Apimela sakarahaensis Pace, 1999
- Apimela samoensis Pace, 1993
- Apimela schuelkei Assing, 2006
- Apimela sinica (Pace, 2012)
- Apimela sinofluminis Pace, 2012
- Apimela subparallela (Bernhauer, 1938)
- Apimela taiwanensis (Pace, 2010)
- Apimela templi Pace, 2004
- Apimela terrestris Pace, 2006
- Apimela truncata Pace, 2006
- Apimela uhligi Pace, 1999
- Apimela ussurica Assing, 2020
- Apimela wunderlei Assing, 2020
- Apimela zerchei Pace, 1996
- Apimela zorzinii Pace, 1994
