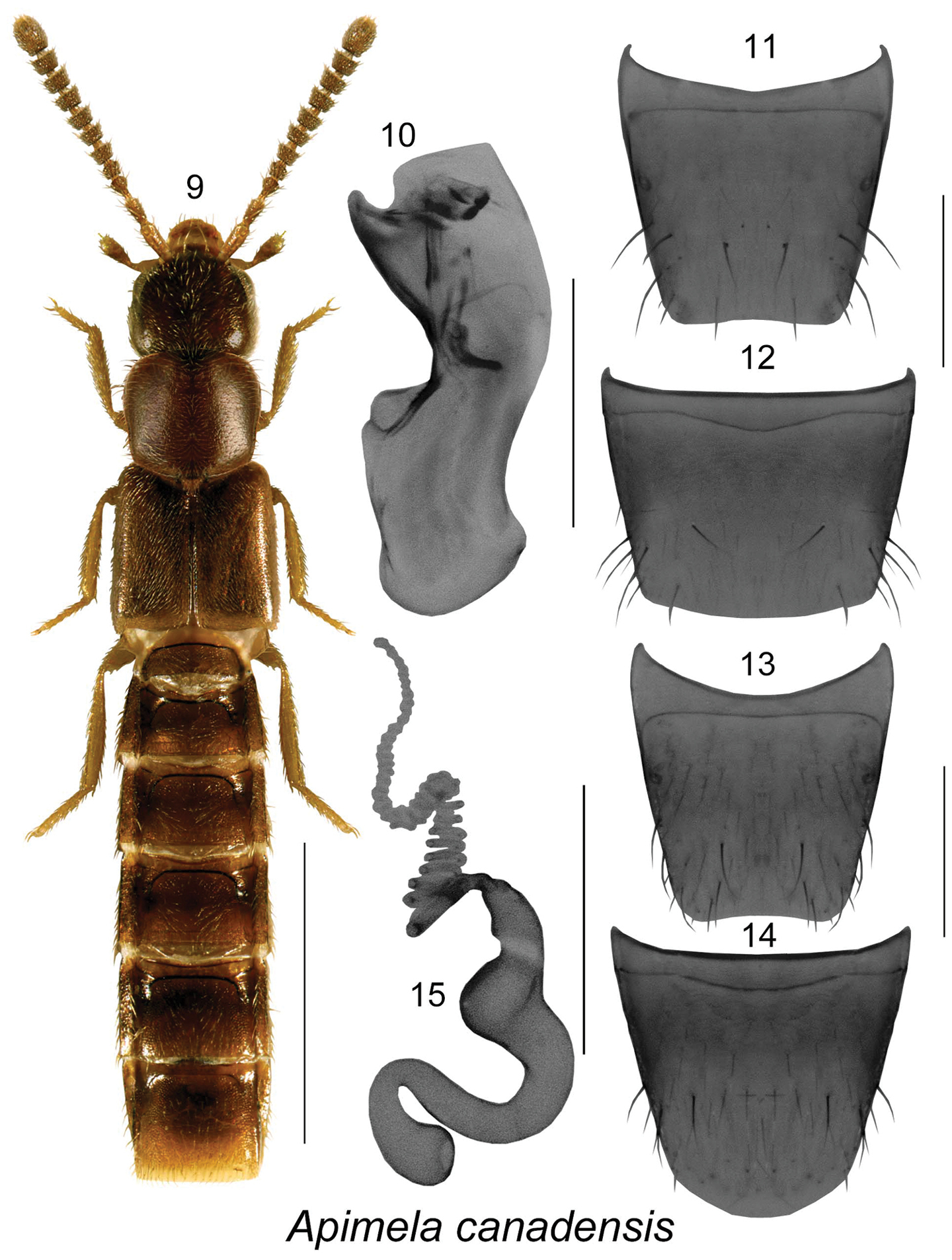

Scientific classification
- Kingdom: Animalia
- Phylum: Arthropoda
- Class: Insecta
- Order: Coleoptera
- Suborder: Polyphaga
- Infraorder: Staphyliniformia
- Family: Staphylinidae
- Genus: Apimela
- Species: A. canadensis

Binomial name
- Apimela canadensis Klimaszewski and Webster, 2017

= Apimela canadensis =

Species of beetle

Apimela canadensis is a species of Staphylinid (rove beetle) first described in 2017 from specimens collected in New Brunswick, Canada. Its species name, canadensis, was given in honour of the 150th anniversary of Canada's Confederation.

== Discovery ==
Apimela canadensis was originally found near the Meduxnekeag River to the west of Woodstock, in New Brunswick (Canada) in 2008.

The holotype and three paratype specimens were captured in the months of May and June on an area of partially shaded cobblestones near the outflow of a brook along the Jacquet River. The adults were found under cobblestones and gravel in sand. One paratype was found along a river margin underneath a cobblestone which was in a grassy area away from the water's edge.

== Description ==
Adult A. canadensis are very small, measuring 2.0–3.0 mm in total length. They are a glossy, yellowish brown in colour, with slightly darker head and covered in a fine pubescence.
