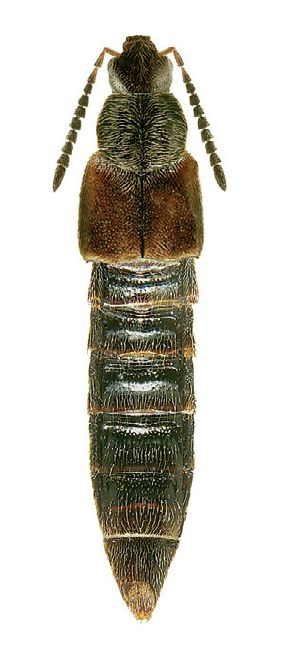

Scientific classification
- Kingdom: Animalia
- Phylum: Arthropoda
- Class: Insecta
- Order: Coleoptera
- Suborder: Polyphaga
- Infraorder: Staphyliniformia
- Family: Staphylinidae
- Genus: Gennadota
- Species: G. canadensis

Binomial name
- Gennadota canadensis Casey, 1906

= Gennadota canadensis =

Species of beetle

Gennadota canadensis is a species of rove beetle in the family Staphylinidae. It is found in North America.
