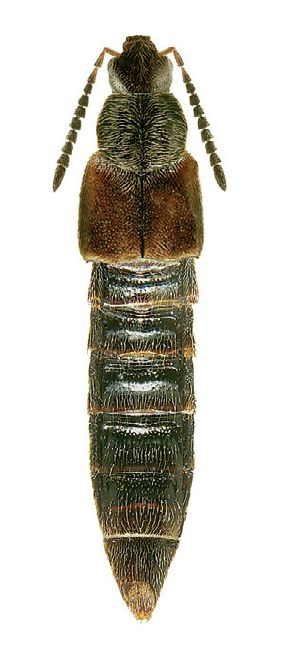
- Gennadota canadensis

Scientific classification
- Kingdom: Animalia
- Phylum: Arthropoda
- Class: Insecta
- Order: Coleoptera
- Suborder: Polyphaga
- Infraorder: Staphyliniformia
- Family: Staphylinidae
- Tribe: Oxypodini
- Genus: Gennadota; Casey, 1906

= Gennadota =

Genus of beetles

Gennadota is a genus of rove beetles in the family Staphylinidae. There are at least two described species in Gennadota.

== Species ==
These two species belong to the genus Gennadota:

- Gennadota canadensis Casey, 1906
- Gennadota puberula (Casey, 1893)
