= International Street =

Themed area at Canada's Wonderland

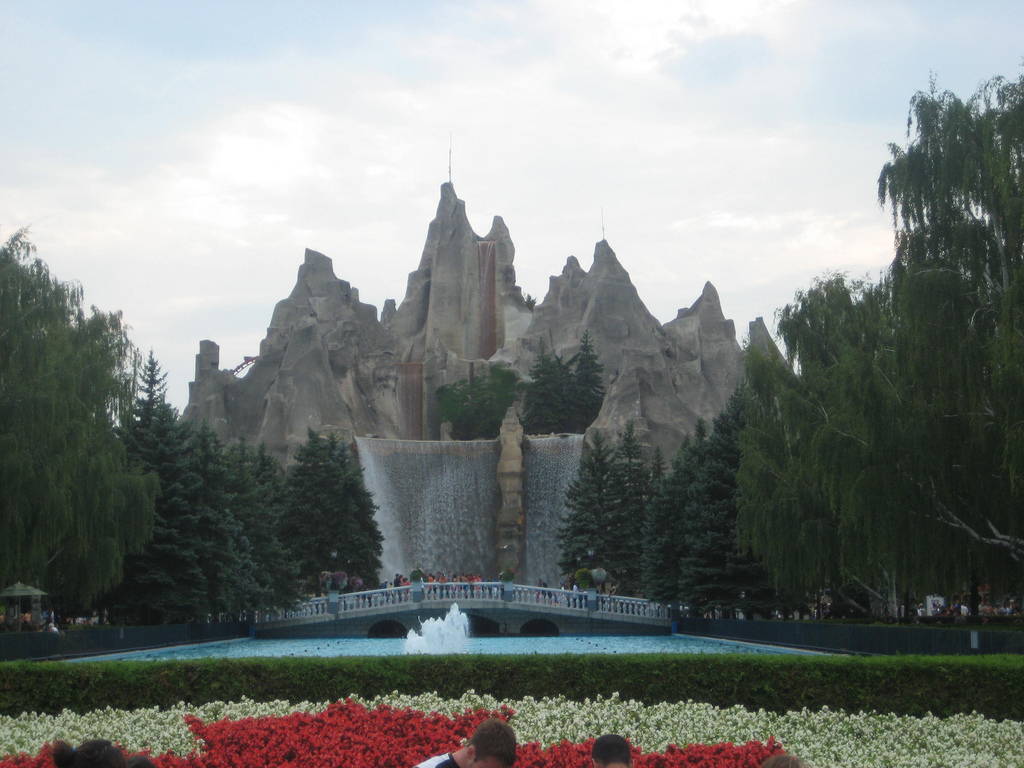
- Wonder Mountain, the centrepiece of Canada's Wonderland

Attractions
- Total: 2
- Shows: 2

Canada's Wonderland
- Coordinates: 43°50′33.16″N 79°32′31.00″W
- Opened: May 23, 1981

International Street is a themed area at Canada's Wonderland in Vaughan, Ontario. Similar to the Main Street, U.S.A. sections of Walt Disney Parks and Resorts, it acts as an entrance way to the park. The street ends at Wonder Mountain, a visual landmark for navigating through much of the park. A similar format is used at sister parks Kings Island and Kings Dominion, albeit with a replica of the Eiffel Tower at the end in both parks. In each instance, the International Street section was created while the park was owned by Kings Entertainment Company, then transferred to Paramount Parks, then to Cedar Fair, and finally to the current owners, Six Flags.

The street features buildings with themes of Alpine, Scandinavian, Latin American, and Mediterranean cultures. A long fountain stretches the full length of the street, leading to a man-made mountain that features a dive show. An amphitheatre features regular shows with local casts and occasional guest performers. In early promotions, International Street was billed as "a feast of cultures, rich and satisfying", featuring foods not often found in theme parks, like shrimp, paella, and smoked sausage. Over the years, retail outlets have moved to more generic kinds of merchandise and well-known Canadian fast food formats.

== Features ==
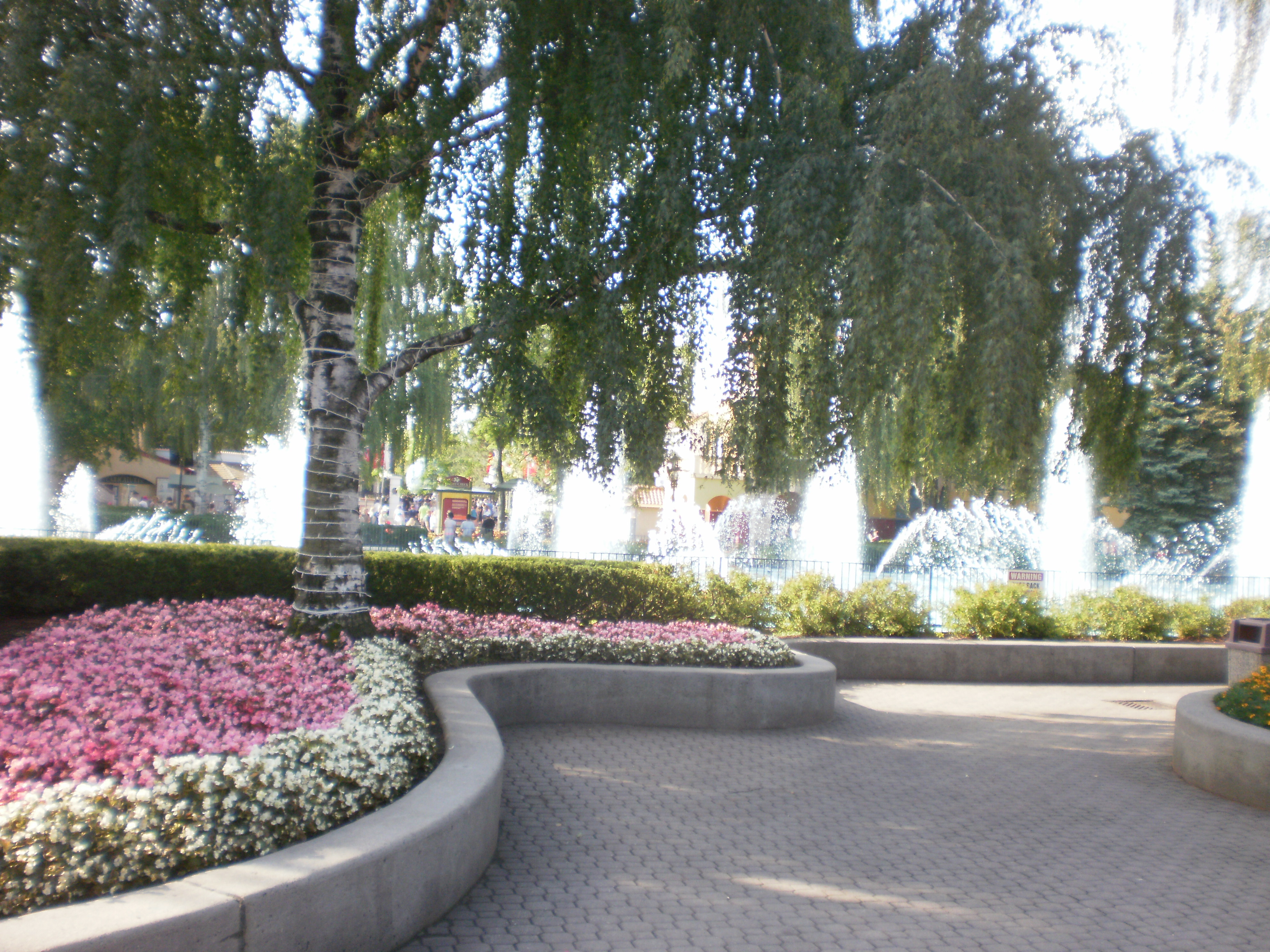
Flowerbeds on International Street.

One of the first sights seen on entering the park is a large flowerbed representing the Canadian flag. The bed is empty during the park's first weeks of being open and is replaced with a faux graveyard during the autumn for Halloween Haunt. Approximately 11,000 begonias are planted in the bed, which is 80 feet (24 m) by 50 feet (15 m) in size. Behind it is a large fountain area, with a variety of water patterns all day and lighting effects at night. A pathway structure, modeled to look like an arch bridge, contained (as of 1982) a computer that controlled the fountain's 93 pneumatic valves and nozzles and its 504 red, white, and turquoise lights. In 1982, the lighting patterns would change roughly every 30 seconds, with a 30-minute rotation. In 2011, the lights were upgraded to offer a range of 16 million colours. Before the park opened, the 300-foot (91 m) by 80-foot (24 m) water basin was referred to as Royal Fountain.

When it opened, the park featured the "world's largest expanse of interlocking paving stones". One source stated that this expanse cost $4 million, another that it consisted of 4 million stones. The stones make walking cooler, are more attractive than asphalt, and make underground sewers and other services more accessible. For the opening, 1100 fully-grown trees were planted, having been purchased from a provincially run nursery in Pickering, Ontario. During the park's first season, it was noticed that crowds tended to go to the right side of International Street, towards Medieval Faire.

== Buildings ==
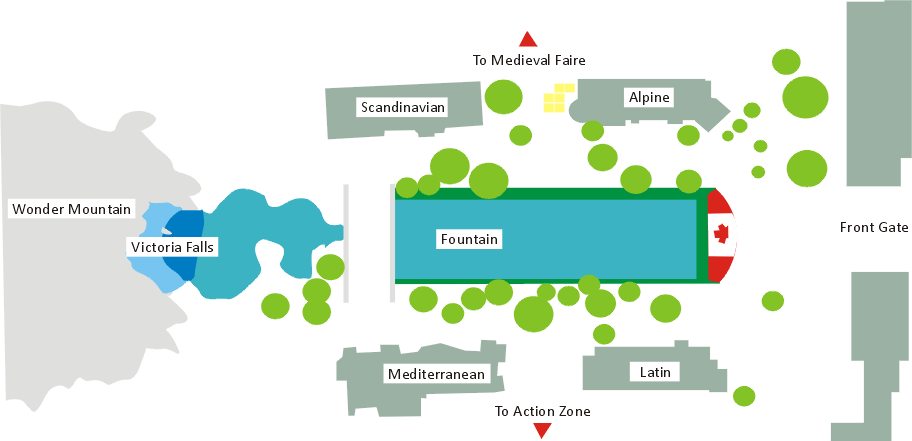
Layout of the park.

Apart from the front gate structure, all buildings on International Street are based, with varying degrees of accuracy, on international building styles. Theming was extended to all details of the buildings. The Toronto Star suggested that "there are no cheap facades. Everything is well-built to last a long time." It recounted a "forlorn looking person" stopping a security guard outside a set of Latin themed washrooms, asking "Am I a Damas or Caballeros?"

In 2011, the entire street was lit up with 300,000 lights for the nighttime show Starlight Spectacular, featuring animated effects projected on to Wonder Mountain. Overlooking the front gate is the Maple Room, a small, higher-end events facility.

=== Front gate ===
In a 1979 report to the municipal government, Canada's Wonderland wrote that they expected the "Front Gate Complex" to include souvenirs, stroller rentals, kennels, wheelchairs, locker rentals, and a check room. They also stated that souvenir carts would be in the entry area. In the early years, Toronto-Dominion Bank had ATMs on site, as well as a bank branch that offered services like cheque encashment. When Cedar Fair took over the park, the store Thrills are Paramount changed its name to Thrills are Wonderland. The structure also includes Front Gate Photo.

While admissions and a dog kennel have always existed outside the front gate, one ride now exits the park. Leviathan, a roller coaster which opened in 2012, encroaches into the visitor parking lot and entrance area.

In 2003, metal detectors were added to the gates and security was doubled after a person was killed in a shooting during a crowded Mother's Day. It happened after two visitors were involved in a fight, apparently over a drug exchange before their visit to the park.

=== Alpine Building ===
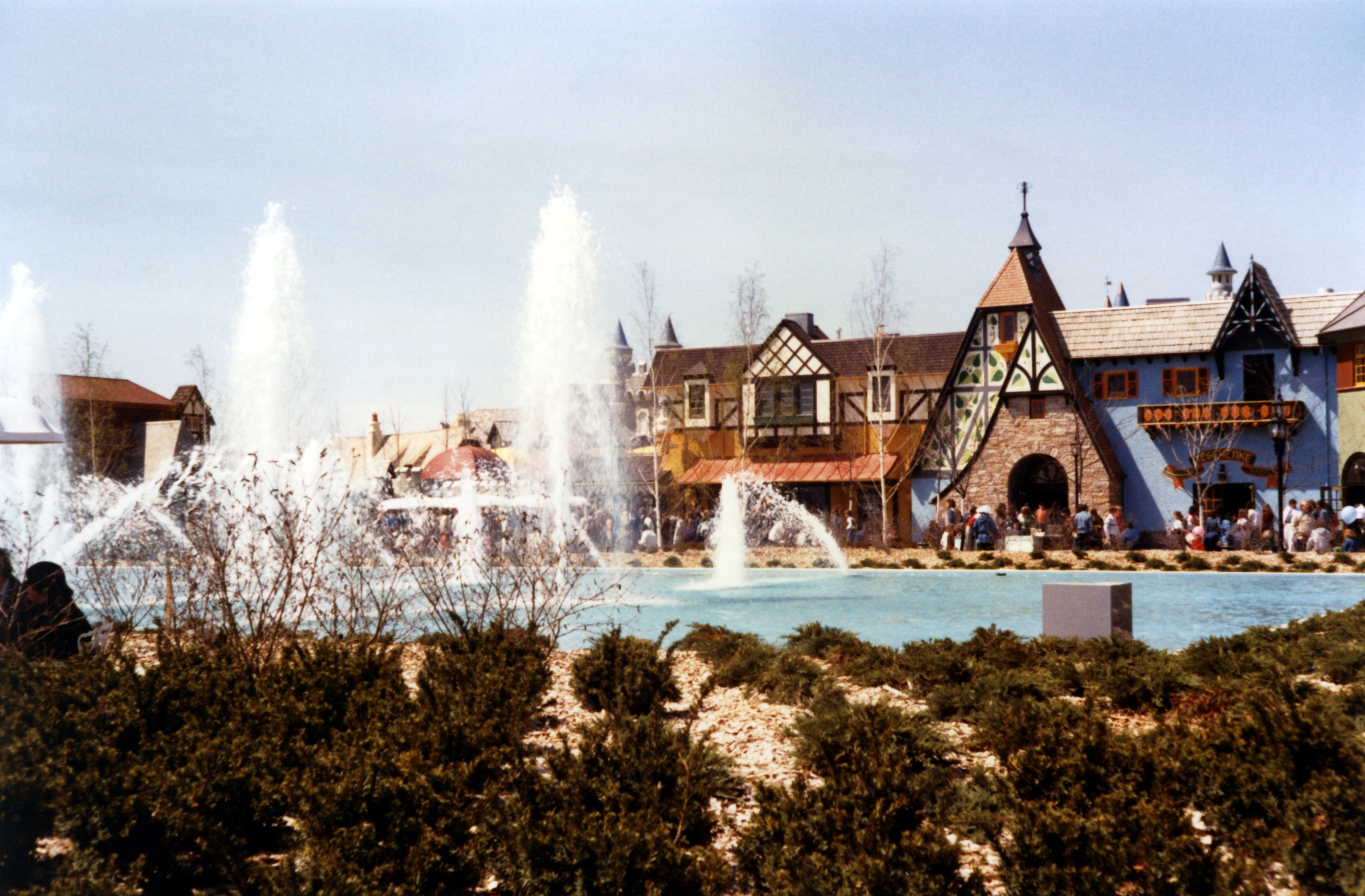
Alpine Building on International Street, May 1981.

According to a report titled "Maple Theme Park", provided to the municipal government by Canada's Wonderland Ltd. in 1979, the Alpine Building was intended to provide: "Camera and film shop (rentals and service), glass blower, glass cutter, china shop, European arts and crafts, Christmas decorations."

The park opened with two restaurants and four retail outlets in the building. The Alphorn Delikatessen offered a breakfast platter, Knackwurst, Bavarian sandwiches, and salads; Eis featured fresh fruit and ice cream covered in chocolate. Glasswaren sold glassware, Geschenke (German for "gifts") sold arts and crafts, Kuckucks Uhren sold cuckoo clocks, and the building was one six locations in the park for the Chas. Abel Photo Shop, which sold film and camera accessories and rented cameras.

In 1989, the Photo Shop advertised "Products by Kodak", and the western end of the unit, towards the entrance to Medieval Faire, was simply called Alphorn. In 2005 or earlier, Locker Room replaced both the Photo Shop and Geschenke with a single unit. In or before 2007, Alphorn Funnel Cakes was joined by a small window-service Dairy Queen; both operate as of 2013. An Orange Julius was added in 2015.

=== Latin Building ===
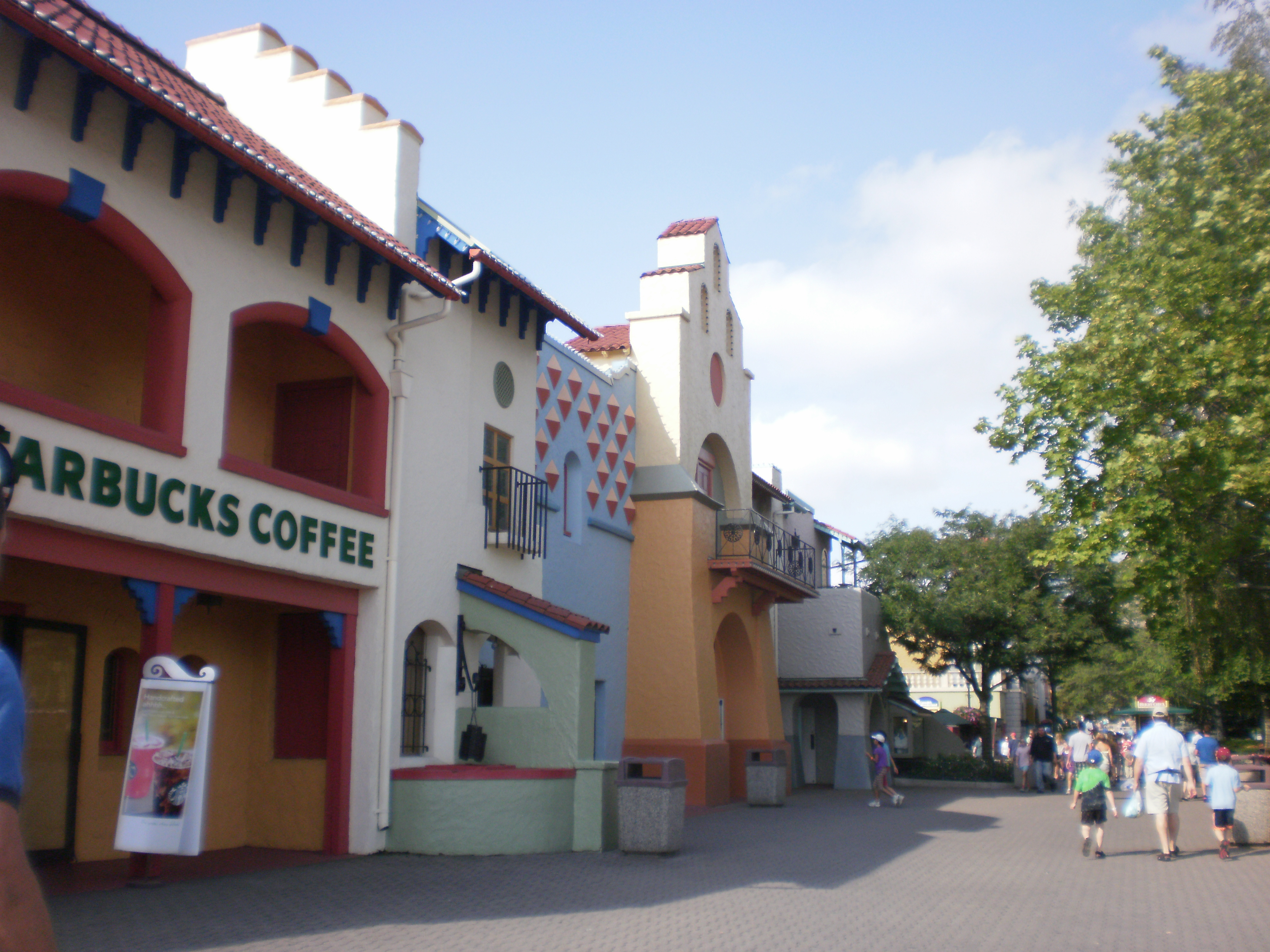
Latin Building, 2011

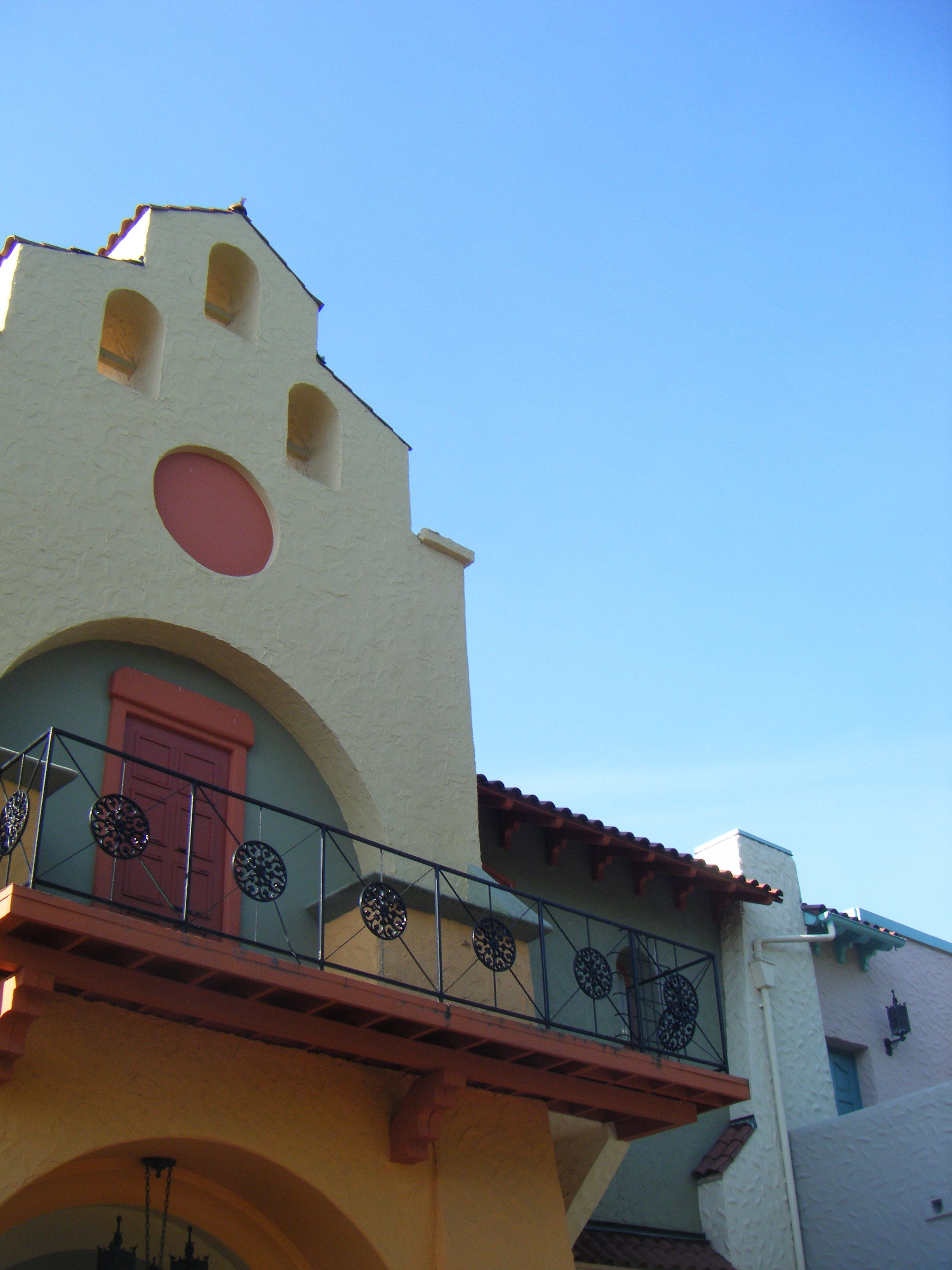
A detail.

The Latin Building is based loosely on Mexican architecture.

The 1979 "Maple Theme Park" report listed plans for: "Tobacco shop (cigarettes, cigars, accessories), camera corner, hand-crafted wearing apparel (jewellery and decorative gifts, Latin American and South America), pottery, plants and baskets (Mexico), giant paper flowers, Spanish dolls."

The park opened with two restaurants in the Latin Building, La Cantina and La Tasca. (Note: La Cantina sold paella and Spanish omelettes until 11 am daily, ranchero burger, Mexican fruit salad, Spanish salad, and Latin punch. La Tasca offered meats and cheeses, sandwiches, and pastries.) Retail outlets were: Imperial Tobacco's John Player and Sons Tabaquero selling tobacco, cigarettes, and cigars; Pelicula, a film shop; Something in Sombreros selling hats and bags; Ceramica selling pottery and clothing; and Very Verde selling plants and wind chimes. Collectively, a 1982 park brochure described a selection of "Mexican leather belts, malachite statues, sombreros, woven baskets".

By 1989, the building still housed La Tasca, La Cantina, and Tabaquero, but the other shops were replaced by a sports shop. La Tasca was replaced in the 2000s by Starbucks coffee shop, and the Streetwear store replaced La Cantina in 2005. An outdoor Mr. Sub counter franchise operated from 2004 to 2012, this location and two others became Subway in 2013. In 2015, a Mill Street Brewery outlet was added next to it.

=== Mediterranean Building ===
Based on architecture of the European countries at the Mediterranean Sea, the 1979 planning report for the park suggested it would be home to a shirt and sweater store with the option for screen printed customization, a shop of hats featuring Hanna Barbera characters, a magic and novelty shop, and a store of Mediterranean decorative gifts and jewellery.

The building opened in 1981. Ristorante offered pizza, spaghetti Milanese, and antipasto salad. Gelati offered grape sherbet (likely actually gelato) and tortoni. Souvenirs and novelties were sold at La Casa Del Regalo (Spanish and Italian for "The Gift House"); T-shirts, sweatshirts, and hats were on sale at Camicie (Italian for "shirts"); and magic tricks could be bought at Maschera (Italian for "mask"). Calling it a "teenager's delight", a publication on the park remarked on the selling of "the most outrageous candles in the world—hot dogs with relish, banana split ..." Pizza was offered for $1 or less per slice, but the Toronto Star deemed the machine-stretched dough "perhaps too cookie-like," in spite of ample cheese and spicy sauce. The grape sherbet included both grape juice and real Italian wine. By 1989, La Casa remained, but Camicie and Maschera had been replaced by The Painted Shirt.

While the park was owned by Paramount Parks, the retail space became the Paramount Studio Store. It was remodeled as if it were a Star Trek film studio set, and The Painted Shop (the unit closest to the Grand Exposition entry) served as a "backstage area", where "Paramount branded clothing and other movie related paraphernalia" were sold. Passing through an archway, customers would enter the Star Trek-themed area, which at first sold only Star Trek merchandise. Both sections were designed by Eye Design International Limited of St Albans, England, with specially constructed fixtures. Gradually, the themed merchandise faded into more general content, and in 2005, maps referred to it solely as the Studio Store. In 2009, under the Cedar Fair Entertainment Company, the store became The Gift Emporium. As of 2015, it was simply the Emporium.

In 1989, the unit closest to the mountain housed Ristorante. It became International Street Pizza Pizza in 1998, and as of 2013 is known as Ristorante Pizza Pizza. The location sells more individual pizza slices than any other Pizza Pizza location in Ontario, despite only being open 130 days a year. Splash Works and Planet Snoopy also feature locations of the chain.

=== Scandinavian Building ===
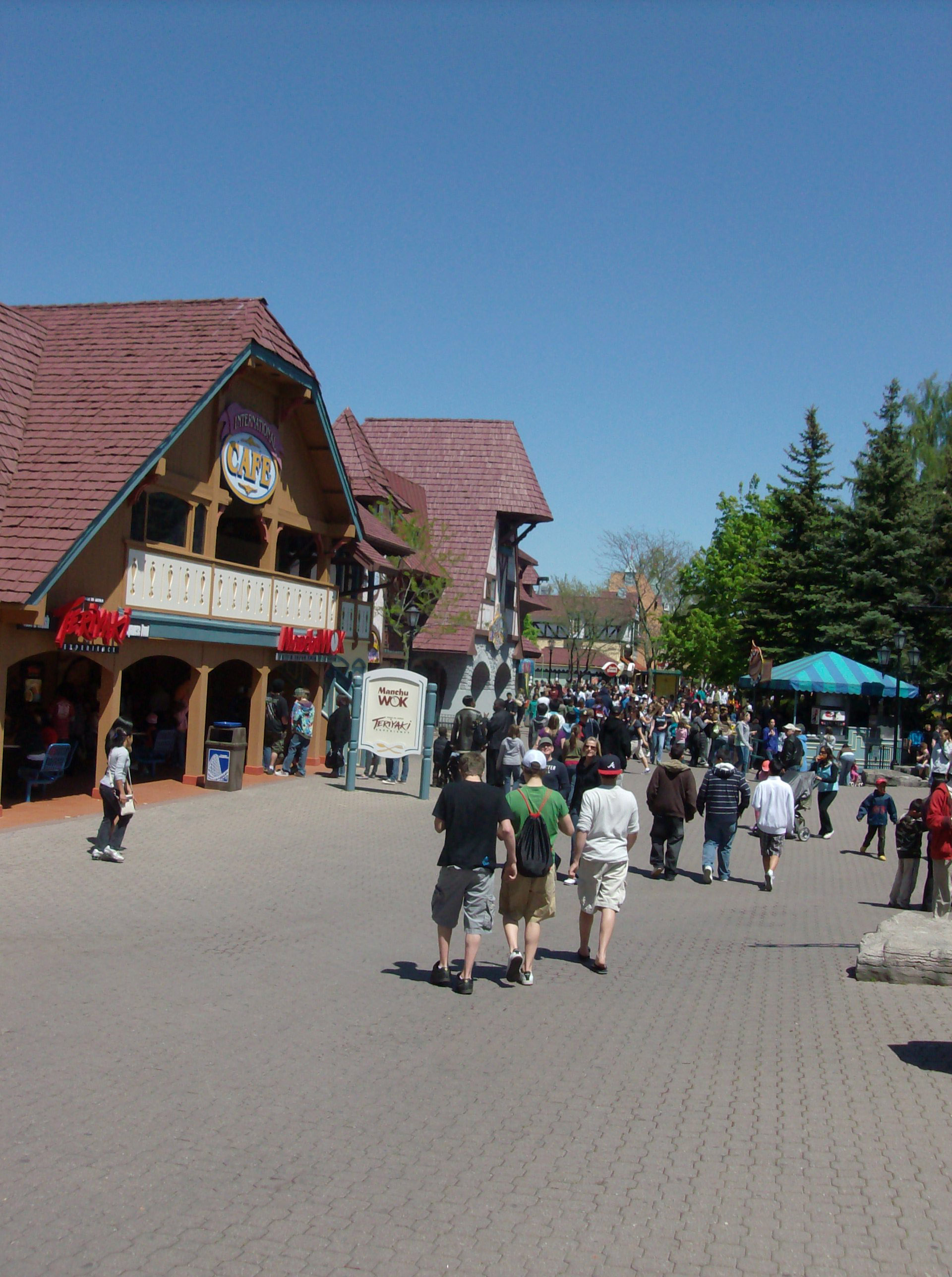
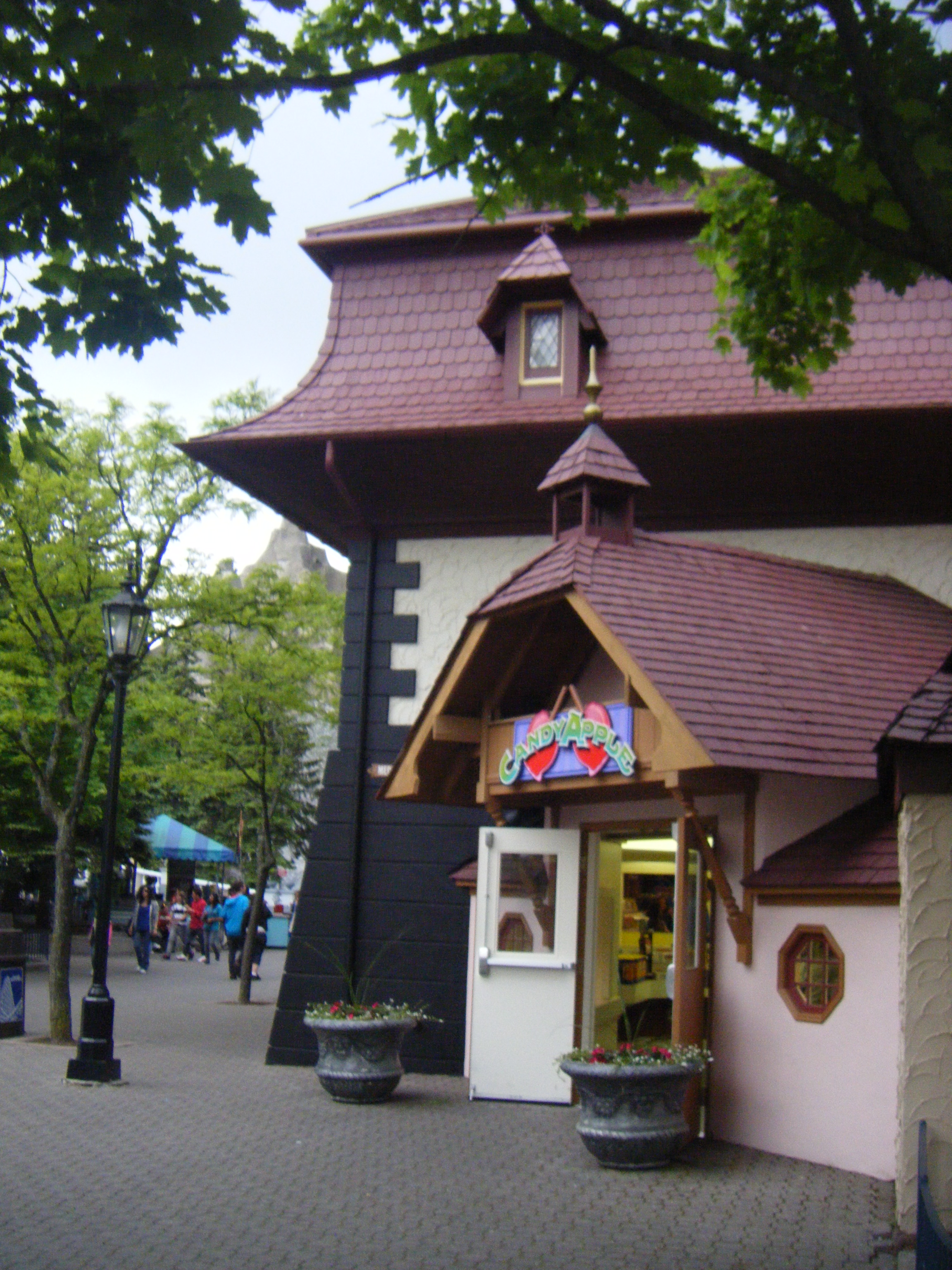
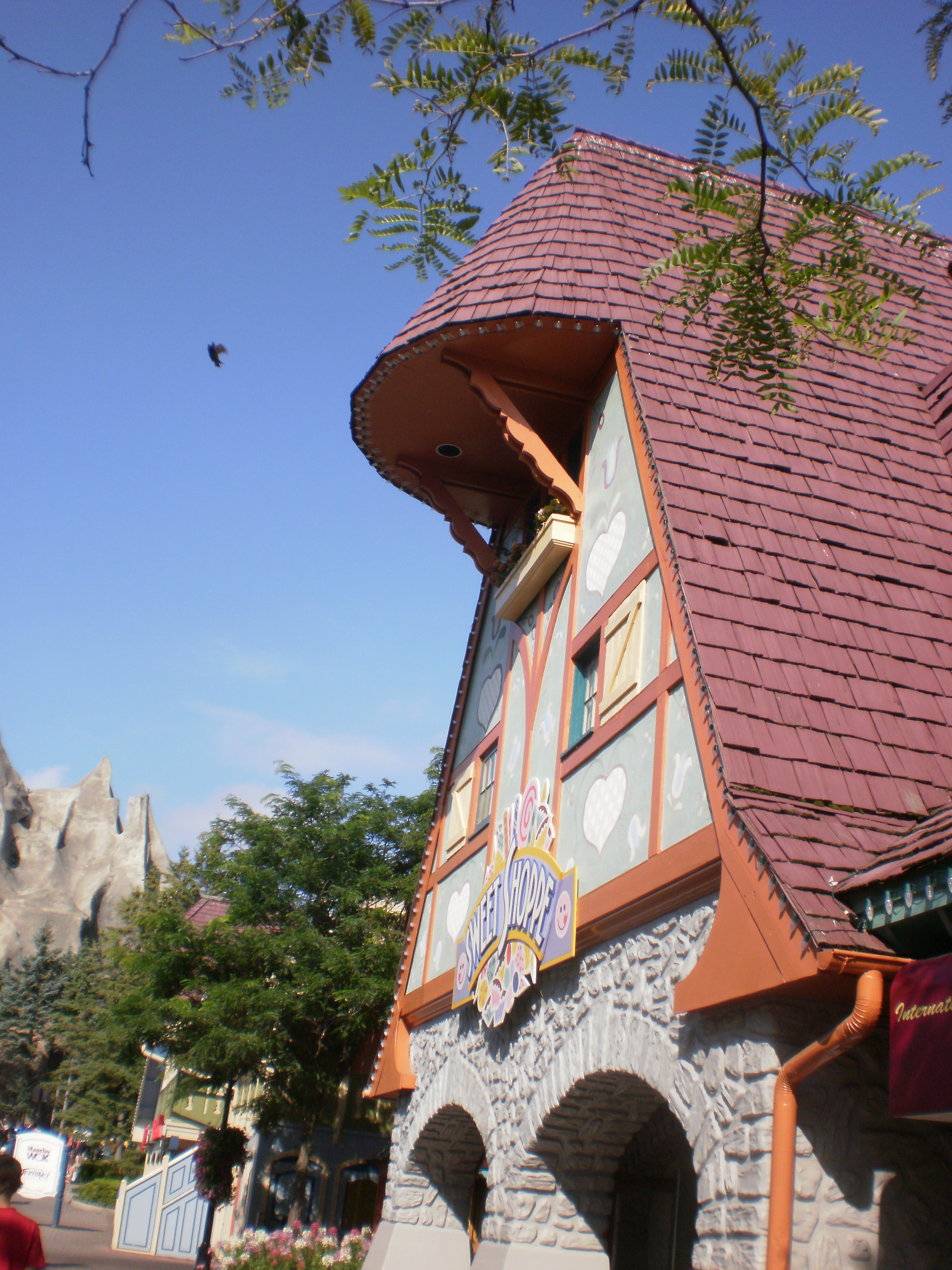
Scandinavian Building in 2007 and 2011.

The 1979 "Maple Theme Park" report stated that the Scandinavian Building would offer: "Candy factory (fudge, novelty candies, jams and jellies, etc.), toy shop (dolls of all nations, Hanna Barbera children's clothing, plush animals, miniatures), hobbies, books, records."

In the first year, Lemonad served lemonade and orange drinks, and Vikingåsbord Smörgåsbord offered a smörgåsbord platter, Danish-style sandwiches, cabbage rolls, and pastries. Retail outlets were: the Neilson Candy Factory; was Legetøj, a toy shop; The Doll's House, a doll shop; (Note: The Doll's House sold "high-quality" porcelain dolls dressed in international costumes, with hand-painted features. Prices in 1982 ranged from $3.50 to $350. (Around Canada's Wonderland (1982) and McDougall "A (whew!) day at Wonderland" (1982).)) and Grammofon Pladen, a record store. The 1981 park map listed The Doll's House as Dukke (Danish for "doll"). Legetøj stayed until at least 1989.

As late as 1992, the Neilson Candy Factory was named M&Ms Candy Factory. Later, it was renamed the Sweet Shoppe, and stayed this way from 2013. In 2021, the Sugar and Spice Pastry Shop was added to the Scandinavian Building. Currently, the name "Candy Factory" is used for a playground in Kidzville (the name was changed in 2016 to Maple Park Treehouse). Outside counters of the unit as of 2013 are Gelato and Gourmet Popcorn. Since at least 2005, the restaurant unit near the mountain has been occupied by Teriyaki Experience and Manchu Wok. In 2015, a Tim Hortons replaced Teriyaki Experience.

== Wonder Mountain ==
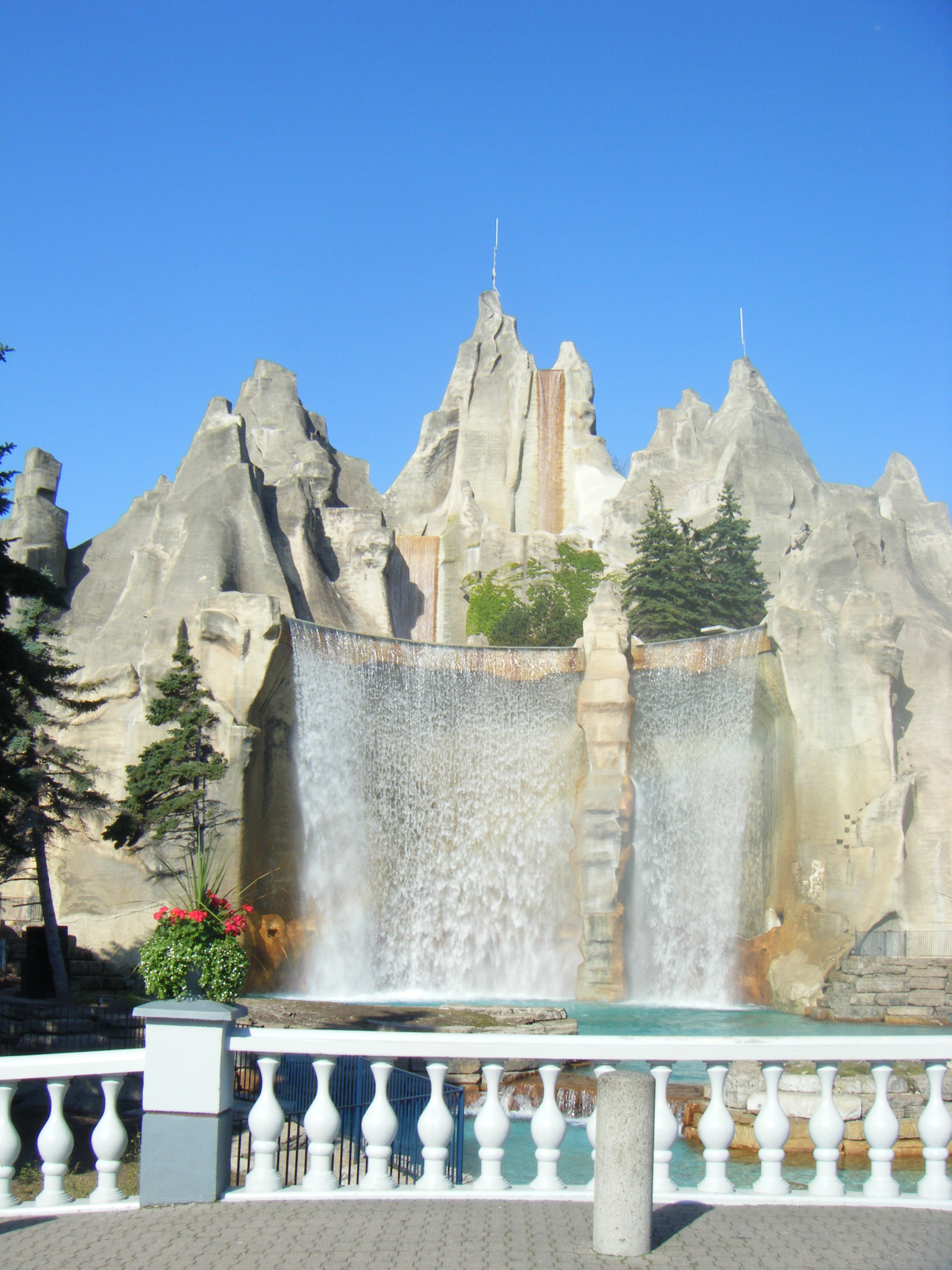
Wonder Mountain is frequently photographed.

Logo used 1981 to 1993, representative of Wonder Mountain's importance to the park's identity.

Located at the end of International Street, and considered entirely part of International Festival in the early years, Wonder Mountain appeared in the park's logo from 1981 to 2006, until Cedar Fair took ownership. Particularly in the early years, when sightlines in the park were longer, the mountain served as a navigation tool to establish one's position within the park.

Wonder Mountain is a steel structure, its meshing covered in autumn 1980 with three layers of gunnite, a special type of cement that was later roughened to make it look like rock. Pumps within the mountain push the water over the waterfall. This water helped cool the park's air conditioning units, stored in a 30 by 12-metre (100 by 40-foot) room inside the mountain. The waterfall itself is named Victoria Falls, and was reportedly based on Victoria Falls, the largest waterfall in the world, which straddles the border between Zambia and Zimbabwe. In 2011, the park's "Victoria Falls" was still listed as powering its air conditioning. The mountain itself was slow to be named. Park publicist Mike Filey suggested in July 1980 that it might be named after Canadian-born Max Aitken, Lord Beaverbrook. Beaverbrook is typically associated with New Brunswick, where he moved at age 13 and started his first newspaper, and with the United Kingdom, where he became a newspaper baron. The Globe and Mail speculated that it might be named Mount Maple, to soothe relations with the local community, or that there might be a naming contest.

The mountain had a circular pathway to the summit. The top offered a panoramic view of each of the existing sections. Strollers were not permitted. The walkway was permanently closed in 1984 so that Vortex could be built.

=== Shows ===
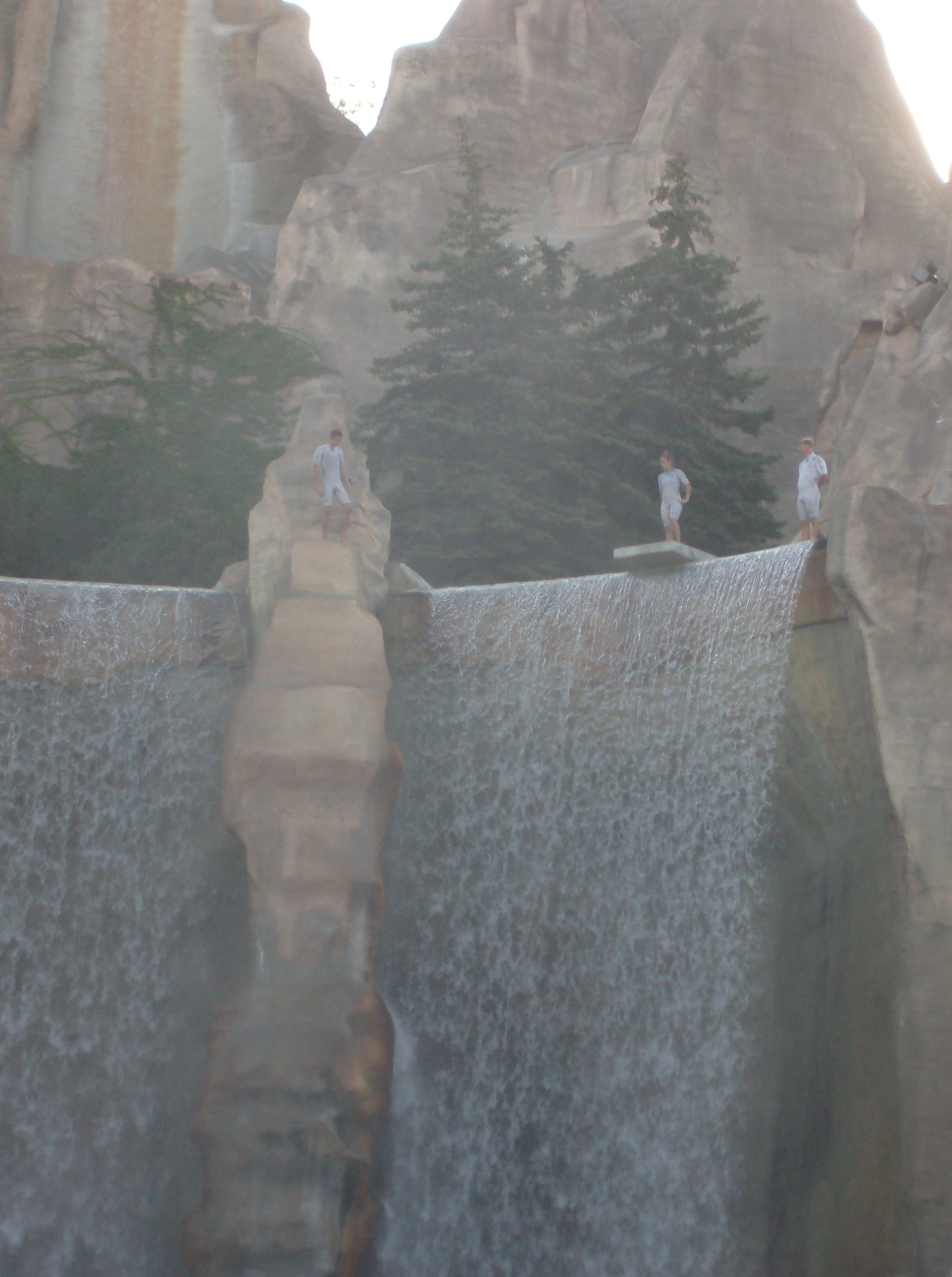
Divers prepare at Wonder Mountain.

A group of mountaineers dressed in Alpine costumes used to climb the mountain in early years, and eight divers between the ages 17 and 24 would dive off the waterfall. In the second season, all eight were Canadians who had competed in major diving competitions. Their schedule was six shows a day on every other day. The dive is 18 m (58 feet), and the pool is 4 m (13 feet) deep in the centre and only 2 m (7 feet) deep at the edges. At the end of the dive, they were descending at 64 km/h (40 mph).

As of 2013, Canada's Wonderland operates two regular shows on Wonder Mountain, "Victoria Falls High Divers" and "Starlight Spectacular". This is in addition to fireworks from the mountain on Victoria Day, Canada Day, and Labour Day.

The first show is called "Victoria Falls High Divers" and usually features about four trained divers who stand right on the edge of Victoria Falls, at a height of over 60 ft (about 18 meters).

Introduced in 2011, "Starlight Spectacular" was created to celebrate the 30th season of Canada's Wonderland and is shown every night at 10 pm through the main season. The show consists of many 3D effects and "dancing lights" moving all around Wonder Mountain. The show returned for 2013 with "Starlight Spectacular: Illumination of Water".

Diver Rodney Joyce from Scarborough, Ontario, aged 18, drowned in a slow whirlpool effect in the pond below the waterfall on Victoria Day weekend in 1988. Joyce had been swimming for ten minutes, when he went closer to the falls to retrieve a frisbee. His brother Gregory, aged 20, rushed to help him, but was pulled under several times. Resuscitation efforts by security staff failed. In an inquest, Wonderland's director of engineering denied the existence of an undertow. A nearby life ring had been tied to a tree using three knots and was only equipped with 6 metres (20 feet) of rope, not enough to reach the middle of the pool. One high diver, who had worked at the park for seven years, claims to have told his supervisor of the undertow during the previous season. That diver was concerned about landing someone, as he claimed unauthorized swimmers were a frequent occurrence at that time. The area was listed as barricaded in an early report, but later reports contradicted that. The witness claimed that there were 30 to 40 bathers at one time. The park's director of safety and security said he was never informed of the undertow, and only saw bathers in the pool on one occasion. Not only was there no statement about pool dangers on record, but the supervisor for the previous three years denied that anyone in their department had expressed concern. Security and extra signs were posted after the incident. Spokespeople pointed out that Joyce shouldn't have been throwing frisbees in the area and suggested that the witness shouldn't have continued to work for the park in the previous season if they had an unaddressed concern.

== Entertainment ==
Opening of the park were held on 23 May 1981, with Ontario Premier William G. Davis and Taft Broadcasting President Dudley Taft presiding. The ceremonies included four children, representing the Arctic, Pacific, Atlantic, and Great Lakes regions of Canada, each pouring a vial of water from their home regions into the park's fountain. Hockey superstar Wayne Gretzky also appeared as a special guest, helping to raise the Canadian flag on the bridge near the waterfall.

In opening year there was a variety of entertainment in International Street. An accordion player dressed as a gondolier would play a selection of songs and take requests. There were also Spanish dancers, a ventriloquist with his character Garlu, magicians, a clown band, a stilt-walking clown, a unicyclist, a balloon-sculpting clown, and two juggling chimney sweeps. A sword balancer was stationed inside the Mediterranean Building.

In 1991, a couple were married on International Street, after winning a contest held by Q107 in conjunction with A Bedrock Wedding (a one-time show in which Fred and Wilma renewed their vows), on The Flintstones′ 50th anniversary.

=== International Showplace ===
"Snuggled against the base of the mountain," the covered amphitheatre seats 3500, and in early years could hold an additional 3000 on the hills in behind. The show for the opening year, "Singing to the World", was a half-hour musical revue covering country, rock and roll, television themes, big band music, and a "Canadian medley"; most performers were high school students. The 1982 show, Jubilee, reached back to music from the 1920s. Productions included Singing to the World and Rock Around the Clock (1981), Deep in the Heart of the Country (1986), Dancin' in the City (1992), It's Magic (1993), Metro Pop (1998), School of Rock (2005-2006), Twistin' to the 60s (2007), Dance To The Music (2008), Signed, Sealed, Delivered (2009), Rockband, LIVE! (2010), and Start Me Up (2012). Since the 2015 season, variety acts have replaced the musical revues.

Originally the facility had sponsored names: it opened as Labatt's International Showplace, and in 1989 became Labatt's Blue International Showplace. Before the park was opened, the attraction was referred to as International Theatre. As well as shows produced by the park, the facility has hosted various outside events, including Toronto Maple Leafs autograph signings, the National Aerobic Championships, YTV Festival of Friends (a benefit concert videotape for Kids Help Phone), the season finales of The Next Star, and concerts by The Nylons, East 17, Chantal Kreviazuk, Ashley MacIsaac, and Colin James.
