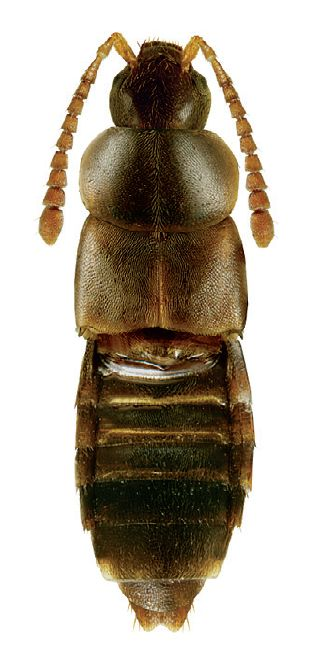
- Devia prospera

Scientific classification
- Kingdom: Animalia
- Phylum: Arthropoda
- Class: Insecta
- Order: Coleoptera
- Suborder: Polyphaga
- Infraorder: Staphyliniformia
- Family: Staphylinidae
- Tribe: Oxypodini
- Genus: Devia; Blackwelder, 1952

= Devia (beetle) =

Genus of beetles

Devia is a genus of rove beetles in the family Staphylinidae. There are at least two described species in Devia.

== Species ==
These two species belong to the genus Devia:

- Devia congruens (Casey, 1893)^{i c g b}
- Devia prospera (Erichson, 1839)^{i c g}

Data sources: i = ITIS, c = Catalogue of Life, g = GBIF, b = Bugguide.net
