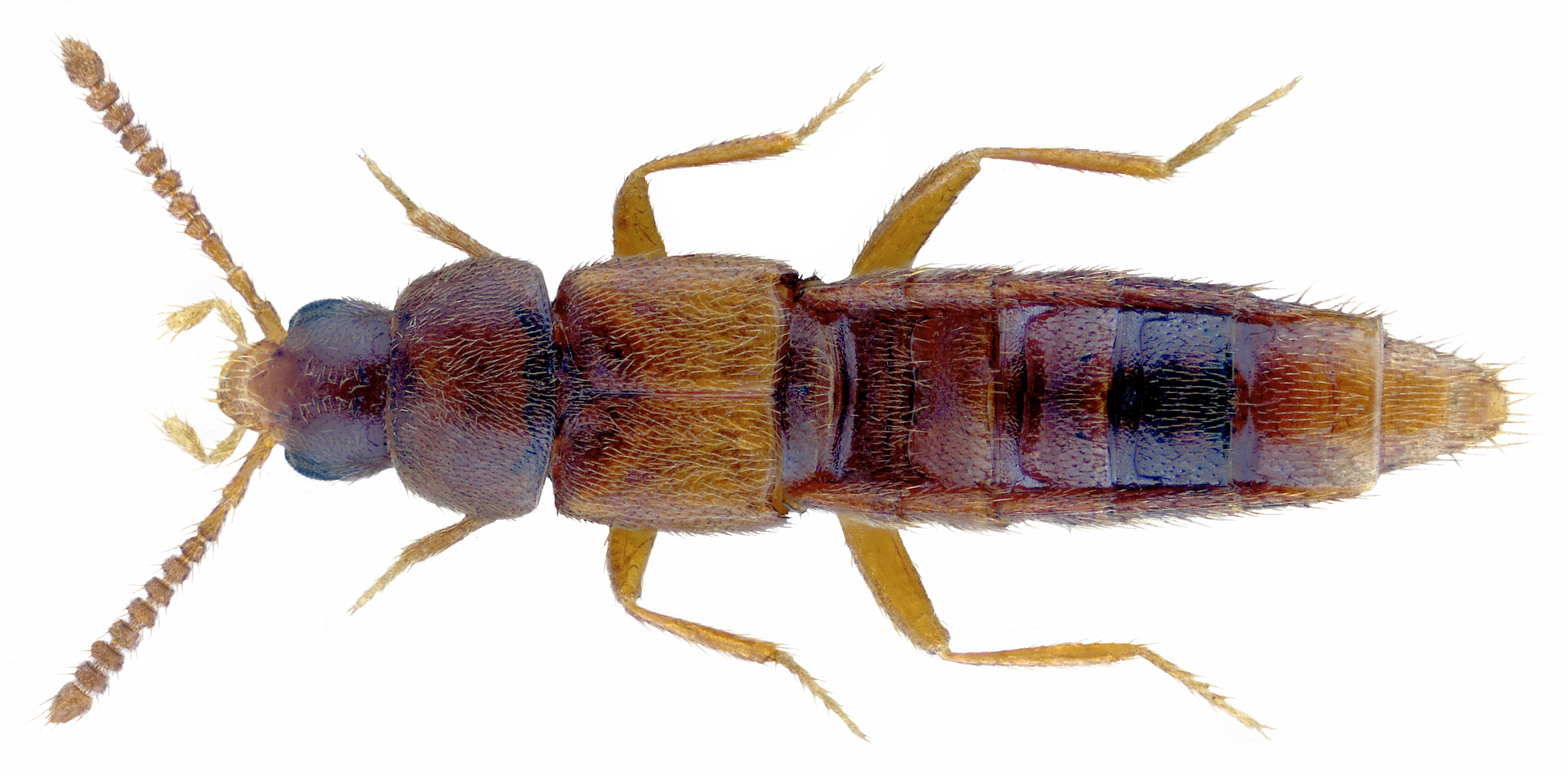
- Dexiogyia corticina, Family Staphylinidae

Scientific classification
- Kingdom: Animalia
- Phylum: Arthropoda
- Class: Insecta
- Order: Coleoptera
- Suborder: Polyphaga
- Infraorder: Staphyliniformia
- Family: Staphylinidae
- Genus: Dexiogyia; Thomson, 1858

= Dexiogyia =

Genus of beetles

Dexiogyia is a genus of beetles belonging to the family Staphylinidae.

The species of this genus are found in Europe and North America.

Species:

- Dexiogyia angustiventris (Casey, 1893)
- Dexiogyia congoensis Scheerpeltz, 1956
- Dexiogyia corticina (Erichson, 1837)
