= Brachyusa =

Scientific classification
- Domain: Eukaryota
- Kingdom: Animalia
- Phylum: Arthropoda
- Class: Insecta
- Order: Coleoptera
- Suborder: Polyphaga
- Infraorder: Staphyliniformia
- Family: Staphylinidae
- Subfamily: Aleocharinae
- Tribe: Oxypodini
- Genus: Brachyusa; Mulsant & Rey, 1873

Genus of beetles

Brachyusa is a genus of beetles belonging to the family Staphylinidae.

The genus was first described by Mulsant and Rey in 1873.

The species of this genus are found in Europe and North America.

Species:

- Brachyusa concolor (Erichson, 1839)
