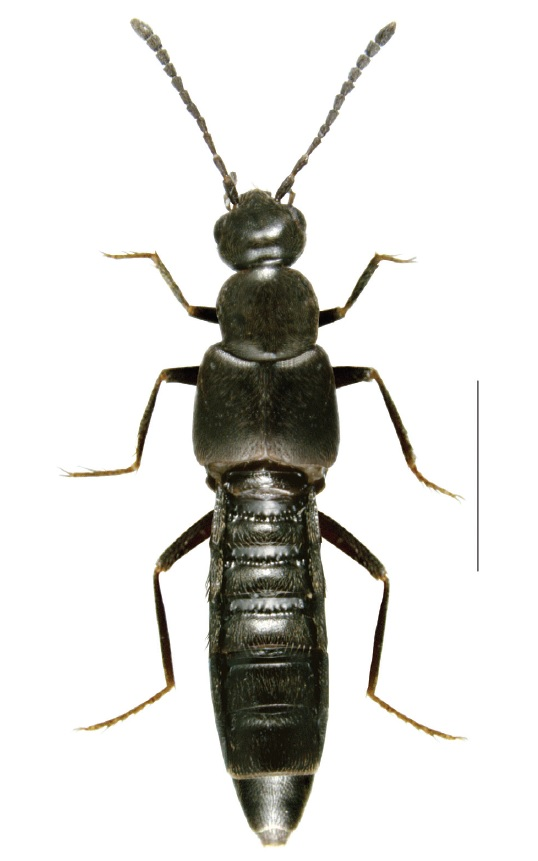
- Gnypeta nigrella

Scientific classification
- Kingdom: Animalia
- Phylum: Arthropoda
- Class: Insecta
- Order: Coleoptera
- Suborder: Polyphaga
- Infraorder: Staphyliniformia
- Family: Staphylinidae
- Tribe: Oxypodini
- Genus: Gnypeta; Thomson, 1858

= Gnypeta =

Genus of beetles

Gnypeta is a genus of beetles belonging to the family Staphylinidae.

The genus was first described by Carl Gustaf Thomson in 1858.

The genus has cosmopolitan distribution.

Species:

- Gnypeta caerulea
- Gnypeta carbonaria
- Gnypeta rubrior
