= Paradilacra =

Scientific classification
- Kingdom: Animalia
- Phylum: Arthropoda
- Clade: Pancrustacea
- Class: Insecta
- Order: Coleoptera
- Suborder: Polyphaga
- Infraorder: Staphyliniformia
- Family: Staphylinidae
- Tribe: Tachyusini
- Genus: Paradilacra; Bernhauer, 1909

Genus of beetles

Paradilacra is a genus of rove beetles in the family Staphylinidae. There is one described species in Paradilacra, P. densissima.
