= Reconciliation Canada =

Canadian non-profit

Reconciliation Canada is a Canadian non-profit group based in Vancouver, Canada. The charity seeks to promote understanding of the Canadian Indian residential school system, which forcibly relocated First Nations, Inuit and Métis children into boarding schools from the late 1800s until the 1990s, as well as the reconciliation process begun by the Truth and Reconciliation Commission. It was started by Chief Robert Joseph and daughter Karen Joseph in 2013.

== History ==
Chief Robert Joseph, a survivor of the residential school system, worked with the Indian Residential School Survivors Society and the Tides Canada Initiatives to start the charity in 2012. Local Vancouver credit union Vancity financed 500,000 CAD of the group's costs. The charity's first major public event was a "Walk for Reconciliation" held in Vancouver on September 22, 2013. Over 70,000 people participated in the walk.
