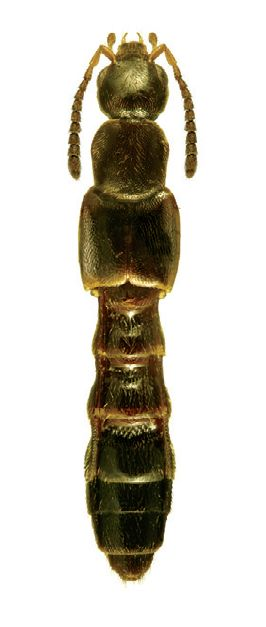
- Tachyusa americana

Scientific classification
- Kingdom: Animalia
- Phylum: Arthropoda
- Class: Insecta
- Order: Coleoptera
- Suborder: Polyphaga
- Infraorder: Staphyliniformia
- Family: Staphylinidae
- Tribe: Tachyusini
- Genus: Tachyusa; Erichson, 1837

= Tachyusa =

Genus of beetles

Tachyusa is a genus of rove beetles in the family Staphylinidae. There are more than 20 described species in Tachyusa.

== Species ==
These 25 species belong to the genus Tachyusa:

- Tachyusa americana Casey, 1906
- Tachyusa americanoides Pasnik, 2006
- Tachyusa arida Casey, 1906
- Tachyusa balteata Erichson, 1839
- Tachyusa brunnea Last, 1966
- Tachyusa cavicollis LeConte, 1863
- Tachyusa coarctata Erichson, 1837
- Tachyusa coarctatoides Pasnik, 2006
- Tachyusa colorata (Fairmaire, 1860)
- Tachyusa concinna Heer, 1839
- Tachyusa constricta Erichson, 1837
- Tachyusa faceta Casey, 1885
- Tachyusa ferialis (Erichson, 1839)
- Tachyusa gracillima LeConte, 1863
- Tachyusa nitella Fauvel, 1895
- Tachyusa nitidula Mulsant & Rey, 1875
- Tachyusa objecta Mulsant & Rey, 1870
- Tachyusa obsoleta Casey, 1906
- Tachyusa ornatella Casey, 1906
- Tachyusa prunosa Casey
- Tachyusa scitula Erichson, 1837
- Tachyusa seticornis Sharp, 1883
- Tachyusa smetanai Pasnik, 2006
- Tachyusa sparsa Sharp, 1883
- Tachyusa subalutacea Casey, 1906
