= Commemorative coins of Canada =

Commemorative coins of Canada are coins issued by the Royal Canadian Mint to commemorate significant persons, special events, and anniversaries.

== Commemorative coins and general circulation ==
This page deals with commemorative coins issued by the Mint for general circulation, in the normal denominations of Canadian coins: two dollar; one dollar; fifty cent; twenty-five cent; ten cents; five cents; and one cent (now discontinued). They are available from the Mint and commercial banks at their normal face value.

Commemorative coins for circulation are distinct from numismatic coins issued by the Royal Canadian Mint, which contain special features and finishes, are available in different denominations than the normal circulating coins, and are for sale at higher prices than their face value.

Because of the large number of commemorative coins issued by the Mint, it is not possible to list them all in one article. Instead, this page provides links to the articles on the different denominations of Canadian coins, which each include lists of the commemorative coins issued in that denomination.

== Commemorative designs on reverse ==
The obverse of all Canadian coins feature the reigning monarch, currently His Majesty King Charles III. The effigies of the monarchs on the coins originally were provided by the Royal Mint in London, leading to similarity between Canadian coins and coins of other Commonwealth nations. Since 1990, however, the effigy has been prepared by Canadian artists.

Commemorative designs are thus on the reverse of the coins. They replace the usual designs, which have been used for most of the denominations since 1937, 1987 for the one dollar coin, and 1996 for the two dollar coin. They are usually designed by an artist other than the artist who designs the effigy of the monarch.

== Centennial series ==
Although specific commemorations are usually limited to only one denomination of the coins, there have been two exceptions where the entire set of coins was issued with commemorative designs. That is, in 1967 to commemorate the Centennial of Canada, and in 2017 to commemorate the 150th anniversary of Canada.

For the 1967 Centennial series, the Mint commissioned noted Canadian artist Alex Colville to design a new series of coins. His designs, and their symbolism, were as follows:

Denomination	Design	Symbolism	Mintage
Penny	Rock dove	Spiritual values and peace	345,140,645
Nickel	Snowshoe rabbit	Emblematic of fertility and new life	36,876,574
Dime	Mackerel	Continuity	62,998,215
Quarter	Lynx	Embodiment of intelligence and decisive action	48,855,500
50-cent piece	Howling wolf	The vastness of Canada	4,211,392
Silver dollar	Goose	Dynamic serenity	6,767,496

For the 2017 Canada 150 series, the Royal Canadian Mint held a contest titled My Canada, My Inspiration to determine the reverse designs of the five circulating coins. The 50-cent coin would contain the Canadian Coat of Arms on the reverse, with the Canada 150 logo, designed by Ariana Cuvin, on the obverse, replacing Queen Elizabeth II.

Denomination	Theme	Designer	Title	Mintage
Nickel	Our Passions	Gerald Gloade	Living Traditions	20,000,000
Dime	Our Character	Amy Choi	Wings of Peace	20,000,000
Quarter	Canada's Future	Joelle Wong	Hope for a Green Future	20,000,000
50-cent piece	Confederation	Ariana Cuvin	CANADA 150	875,000
Loonie	Our Achievements	Wesley Klassen	Connecting a Nation	10,000,000
Toonie	Our Wonders	Stephen and Timothy Hsia	Dance of the Spirits	10,000,000

== Two dollar coin (Toonie) ==
The two dollar coin, nicknamed the toonie, was issued in 1996, replacing the two dollar note issued by the Bank of Canada. It normally features a polar bear on the reverse.

For the list of commemorative two dollar coins issued by the Mint, see: Toonie.

== One dollar coin (Voyageur and Loonie) ==
=== Voyageur dollar ===
There have been two different designs for the one dollar coin. The first, the Voyageur one dollar coin, was issued in 1935 to commemorate the twenty-five years of King George V's reign. It featured a voyageur (French-Canadian fur trader) and an indigenous man, paddling a birch-bark canoe laden with furs, with the northern lights in the background. Although intended as a commemorative coin, it continued to be issued until 1986, the year before the Loonie was introduced.

For information on the Voyageur dollar, see: Voyageur dollar.

=== Loonie ===
In 1987, the Mint introduced a new one dollar coin. It normally features a loon on the reverse. Nicknamed the loonie, it replaced both the one dollar note issued by the Bank of Canada and the Voyageur dollar.

For the list of commemorative one dollar coins issued by the Mint since 1987, see: Loonie.

== Fifty cent coin ==
The fifty cent coin has borne the Canadian coat of arms on its reverse since the current coin designs were introduced in 1937. There were minor changes to the design of the arms in 1959, when the depiction of the arms was simplified. As well, the Queen suggested that the Tudor crown on the arms be replaced with the crown of St Edward the Confessor. Although a circulating coin, the fifty-cent coin is rarely used.

For the list of commemorative fifty cent coins issued by the Mint, see: 50-cent piece (Canadian coin).

== Twenty-five cent coin (Quarter) ==
The twenty-five cent coin has borne a caribou on its reverse since the current coin designs were introduced in 1937. The twenty-five cent coin is the coin which is most frequently used for commemorative purposes.

For the list of commemorative twenty-five cent coins issued by the Mint, see: Quarter (Canadian coin).

== Ten cent coin (Dime) ==
The ten cent coin has borne the Nova Scotia schooner, the Bluenose, on its reverse since the current coin designs were introduced in 1937.

For the list of commemorative ten cent coins issued by the Mint, see: Dime (Canadian coin).

== Five cent coin (Nickel) ==
The five cent coin has borne a beaver on its reverse since the current coin designs were introduced in 1937.

For the list of commemorative five cent coins issued by the Mint, see: Nickel (Canadian coin).

== One cent coin (Penny) ==
The one cent coin bore two maple leaves on its reverse since the current coin designs were introduced in 1937 until its discontinuance in 2013.

For the list of commemorative one cent coins issued by the Mint, see: Penny (Canadian coin).

== See also ==
- Canadian dollar
- Coins of the Canadian dollar
- Banknotes of the Canadian dollar
- Numismatic Coins Issued by the Royal Canadian Mint
