= Coins of the Canadian dollar =

The coins of Canada are produced by the Royal Canadian Mint and denominated in Canadian dollars ($) and the subunit of dollars, cents (¢). An effigy of the reigning monarch always appears on the obverse of all coins. There are standard images which appear on the reverse, but there are also commemorative and numismatic issues with different images on the reverse.

== Circulation denominations ==
There are six denominations of Canadian circulation coinage in production: 5¢, 10¢, 25¢, 50¢, $1, and $2. Officially they are each named according to their value (e.g. "10-cent piece"), but in practice only the 50-cent piece is known by that name. The three smallest coins are known by the traditional names "nickel" (5¢), "dime" (10¢), and "quarter" (25¢), and the one-dollar and two-dollar coins are called the "loonie" (a hypocorism of the loon depiction on the reverse) and the "toonie" (a portmanteau of "two" and "loonie") respectively. The production of the Canadian 1-cent piece (known as the "penny") was discontinued in 2012, as inflation had reduced its value significantly below the cost of production.

Canadian coins have medallic orientation, like British or euro coins, and unlike U.S. coins, which have coin orientation.

Canadian coins
Value	Image		Technical parameters				Description			English name	French name	First minted	Discontinued	Withdrawn
Value	Obverse	Reverse	Diameter	Thickness	Mass	Composition	Edge	Obverse	Reverse	English name	French name	First minted	Discontinued	Withdrawn
1¢			19.05 mm	1.45 mm	2.35 g	94% steel; 1.5% nickel; 4.5% copper plating	Plain (1920–1981, 1997–2012); 12-sided (1982–1996)	Queen Elizabeth II	Maple leaf	Penny	Sou/cent/cenne; Cent noire; Cenne noire	1953	May 2012	February 4, 2013; In limited use
5¢			21.2 mm	1.76 mm	3.95 g	94.5% steel; 3.5% copper; 2% nickel plating	Plain (1922–1942, 1963–present); 12-sided (1942–1962)	Queen Elizabeth II	Beaver	Nickel	Cinq sous; Cinq cents; Cinq cennes	1953	Still produced	Still in use
10¢			18.03 mm	1.22 mm	1.75 g	92% steel; 5.5% copper; 2.5% nickel plating	Milled	Queen Elizabeth II	The Bluenose	Dime	Dix sous; Dix cents; Dix cennes	1953	Still produced	Still in use
25¢			23.88 mm	1.58 mm	4.4 g	94% steel; 3.8% copper; 2.2% nickel plating	Milled	Queen Elizabeth II	Caribou	Quarter	Vingt-cinq sous; Vingt-cinq cents; Vingt-cinq cennes; Trente sous	1953	Still produced	Still in use
50¢			27.13 mm	1.95 mm	6.9 g	93.15% steel; 4.75% copper; 2.1% nickel plating	Milled	Queen Elizabeth II	Canadian coat of arms	50¢ piece, half-dollar	Cinquante sous; Cinquante cents; Cinquante cennes	1959	Produced but uncirculated since 2003.	Not withdrawn, in limited use
50¢			27.13 mm	1.95 mm	6.9 g	93.15% steel; 4.75% copper; 2.1% nickel plating	Milled	King Charles III	Canadian coat of arms	50¢ piece, half-dollar	Cinquante sous; Cinquante cents; Cinquante cennes	2023	Produced but uncirculated since 2003.	Not withdrawn, in limited use
$1			32.15 mm	2.88 mm	15.62 g	99.9% nickel	Milled	Queen Elizabeth II	Voyageurs in a canoe	Voyageur dollar; "Silver" dollar		1953	1987	Replaced by the loonie in 1987. Obsolete but still legal tender. In limited use.
$1			26.5 mm	1.95 mm	7 g	91.5% nickel; 8.5% bronze plating (88% copper, 12% tin)	Plain, 11-sided	Queen Elizabeth II	Common loon	Loonie	Piastre; Piasse; Huard	1987	2011	Still in use
$1			26.5 mm	1.95 mm	6.27 g	Brass-plated steel	Plain, 11-sided	Queen Elizabeth II	Common loon with security feature	Loonie	Piastre; Piasse; Huard	2012	2023	Still in use
$1			26.5 mm	1.95 mm	6.27 g	Brass-plated steel	Plain, 11-sided	King Charles III	Common loon with security feature	Loonie	Piastre; Piasse; Huard	2023	Still produced	Still in use
$2			28 mm	1.8 mm	7.3 g	Ring: 99% nickel; Centre: 92% copper; 6% aluminium; 2% nickel	Intermittent milled / smooth	Queen Elizabeth II	Polar bear	Toonie	Deux piastres; Deux piasses	1996	2011	Still in use
$2			28 mm	1.8 mm	6.92 g	Ring: Nickel-plated steel; Centre: Aluminum bronze	Intermittent milled / smooth / edge-lettered	Queen Elizabeth II	Polar bear with 2 security features	Toonie	Deux piastres; Deux piasses	2012	Still produced	Still in use
These images are to scale at 2.5 pixels per millimetre. For table standards, see the coin specification table.

The 50¢ piece circulates much less than other Canadian coins. Between the years 2000 and 2007 the Royal Canadian Mint struck fewer than 16 million of them; by contrast, during the same period, over 2.25 billion quarters were released. This coin is sometimes called a "half-dollar".

Other than the $2 coin (for which there is no American equivalent), the denominations of Canadian coinage correspond to those of United States coinage. The sizes of the coins other than the 50¢ piece are roughly equal to those of current U.S. coins, though this has not always been true. They have a different metallic composition and most of them are thinner, and thus weigh slightly less, than the analogous U.S. coins. The U.S. penny settled on its current size in 1857, whereas the Canadian penny was much larger (25 mm [1 in]) until 1920. Because they are easily mistaken for each other, U.S. and Canadian coins worth 5 cents, 10 cents, and 25 cents sometimes circulate in the other country. Due to the usually higher value of the U.S. dollar, it is common in Canada to accept U.S. coins at par or face value. Canadian coins are not commonly accepted in the U.S. but sometimes circulate in states that see many Canadian visitors. Their differing physical characteristics prevent them from being accepted interchangeably by most coin-operated machines.

There was formerly some correspondence between the size of Canadian coins and British coins of similar value, leading to them sometimes being mistaken for the other due to the identical portrait of the monarch. For example, the large Canadian penny was identical in size and value to the contemporary British half-penny, which was 25 mm (1 in) in the Edward VII version, and slightly larger during Victoria's reign. Likewise, the Canadian quarter (23.81 mm diameter) was virtually identical in size and value to the British shilling – worth 12 British pence or about 24 Canadian cents, with a 24-millimetre (15/16 in) diameter. The Canadian 5¢ coins, until the larger nickel coins of 1922, were 15 mm silver coins quite different from the U.S. "Liberty head" nickels of 1883 to 1913, which were 21.2 mm and copper-nickel alloy, but more like the older U.S. half dimes.

=== Developments in coinage ===
The most significant recent developments in Canadian coinage were the introduction of $1 and $2 coins and the withdrawal of the one cent piece. The $1 coin (the "loonie") was released in 1987. The $1 banknote remained in issue and in circulation alongside the one-dollar coin for the next two years, until it was withdrawn in 1989. The coin was to be the voyageur-design silver (then nickel) dollar coins that had previously been in limited circulation. The dies were lost or stolen in November 1986, requiring a redesign. The new coin is colloquially called the "loonie", for the common loon on its reverse, and the name is frequently applied to the currency unit as well. It is made of nickel plated with aureate bronze. The $2 coin, carrying a polar bear, was introduced in 1996. It is usually called the "toonie" and is bimetallic. The $2 banknote was withdrawn at the same time that the coin was released. Unlike several U.S. attempts to introduce a dollar coin, the new coins were quickly accepted by the public, owing largely to the fact that the Bank of Canada and the government forced the switch by removing the $1 and $2 bills from circulation.

Between 1997 and 2001, the $1 loon coin was not issued for general circulation. Due to the high demand for the $2 polar bear coin (mintages between 1997 and 2001 were as high as 29 million in 2000 alone), the $1 coin was only produced for the standard collector sets that were made available on an annual basis, such as the Uncirculated, O Canada, Specimen and Proof sets.

On March 29, 2012, the Canadian government announced that the 1¢ coin would be retired. The Royal Canadian Mint stopped producing 1¢ coins in May 2012, and in February 2013 the Bank of Canada stopped distributing them, but the coins remain legal tender. Cash transactions are rounded to the nearest 5¢, while non-cash transactions (using cheques, credit cards, or debit cards) will continue to be rounded to the nearest 1¢.

=== Production ===
Canadian coins are issued by the Royal Canadian Mint and struck at their facilities in Winnipeg. All special wording on commemorative coins appears in both of Canada's languages, English and French. All of the standard wording on the reverse sides of non-commemorative coins is identical in both languages. On the obverse sides, the name and title of the Canadian Monarch appear in an abbreviated-Latin circumscription. On coins struck since November 2023, this reads "Charles III D. G. Rex", but coins reading "Elizabeth II D. G. Regina" continue to circulate. The initials stand for "Dei gratia"; the entire phrases mean 'Charles III, by the grace of God, King' and 'Elizabeth II, by the grace of God, Queen'.

The Vancouver 2010 Winter Olympics commemorative quarters do not have the inscription "D.G. Regina", and they read "Canada Elizabeth II", along with the date of issue and Ilanaaq, the emblem of the games.

== History ==
=== Coins of the Colonies ===
Beginning in 1858, various colonies of British North America started issuing their own coins denominated in cents, featuring the likeness of Queen Victoria on the obverse. These replaced the sterling coins previously in circulation. The Province of Canada was the first to issue decimal coins. They were based on the value of the American dollar, due to an influx of American silver. Denominations issued were 1¢, 5¢, 10¢, and 20¢. The 1¢ coin was issued again in 1859, but it was very unpopular due to its extremely light weight. The coins had to be discounted by around 20% to get them into circulation. Other colonies that issued decimal coinage were New Brunswick and Nova Scotia both starting in 1861, Newfoundland in 1865, and Prince Edward Island in 1871. Many examples can be seen online via the Canadian Currency Museum.

=== Queen Victoria coinage ===
In 1867, the British parliament passed The British North America Act, 1867 (now known as the Constitution Act, 1867), uniting the Province of Canada, Nova Scotia, and New Brunswick into a single country. Coins of the three former colonies continued to circulate until 1870, with all being legal tender throughout the country. As other colonies subsequently joined Canada, they dropped their colonial coinage and adopted the national Canadian currency.

In 1870, the first national coinage of the Dominion of Canada was issued in denominations of 5¢, 10¢, 25¢, and 50¢. A 1¢ coin was not issued until 1876. The designs were standardized with the head of Queen Victoria on the obverse, value and date with a crowned maple wreath reverse, except for the 1¢ coin, which had on its reverse a maple vine circlet.

=== King Edward VII coinage ===
In 1902, the first coins of King Edward VII's coinage were issued. The 1902 5¢ coin is of interest to collectors, as its design includes the outmoded St. Edward's Crown instead of the Imperial State Crown. These coins were hoarded upon being issued, as the public believed that an error had been made. In 1903, the design of the 5¢ was modified accordingly.

In 1907, Heaton's Mint struck its last issue of Canadian coins – the 1907H 1¢, which is quite scarce. In 1908, the Royal Canadian Mint at Ottawa was opened. At that time the Ottawa mint was known as the Royal Mint, Ottawa branch. The name "Royal Canadian Mint" was first used in 1931.

The reverse design on the 10¢ coins include several varieties in relation to the leaves.

=== King George V coinage ===
Edward VII died in 1910 and was succeeded by his son, King George V. His effigy appeared on all coins minted in Canada afterwards, as soon as new dies were obtained.

The initial issue of George V coinage is known as the "Godless" coinage, because the abbreviation "Dei gra:", (for "Dei gratia" or '[king] by the grace of God'), was omitted from the king's titles. When the public noticed this, there was a huge outcry at this breach of tradition, and the phrase was later restored. All the coins from the 1¢ to 50¢ were issued. The 50¢ is the scarcest of all the coins minted in 1911, with a mintage of 209,972. The Canadian Coin News publication printed an article showing a well-worn 1911 50¢ example that did have the "Dei gra:" abbreviation. This coin has not yet been certified as genuine, having been rejected by ICCS, the popular Canadian grading company. The 1911 pattern dollar coin was produced with the "Dei gra:" abbreviation on the two known silver examples and the one known example in lead.

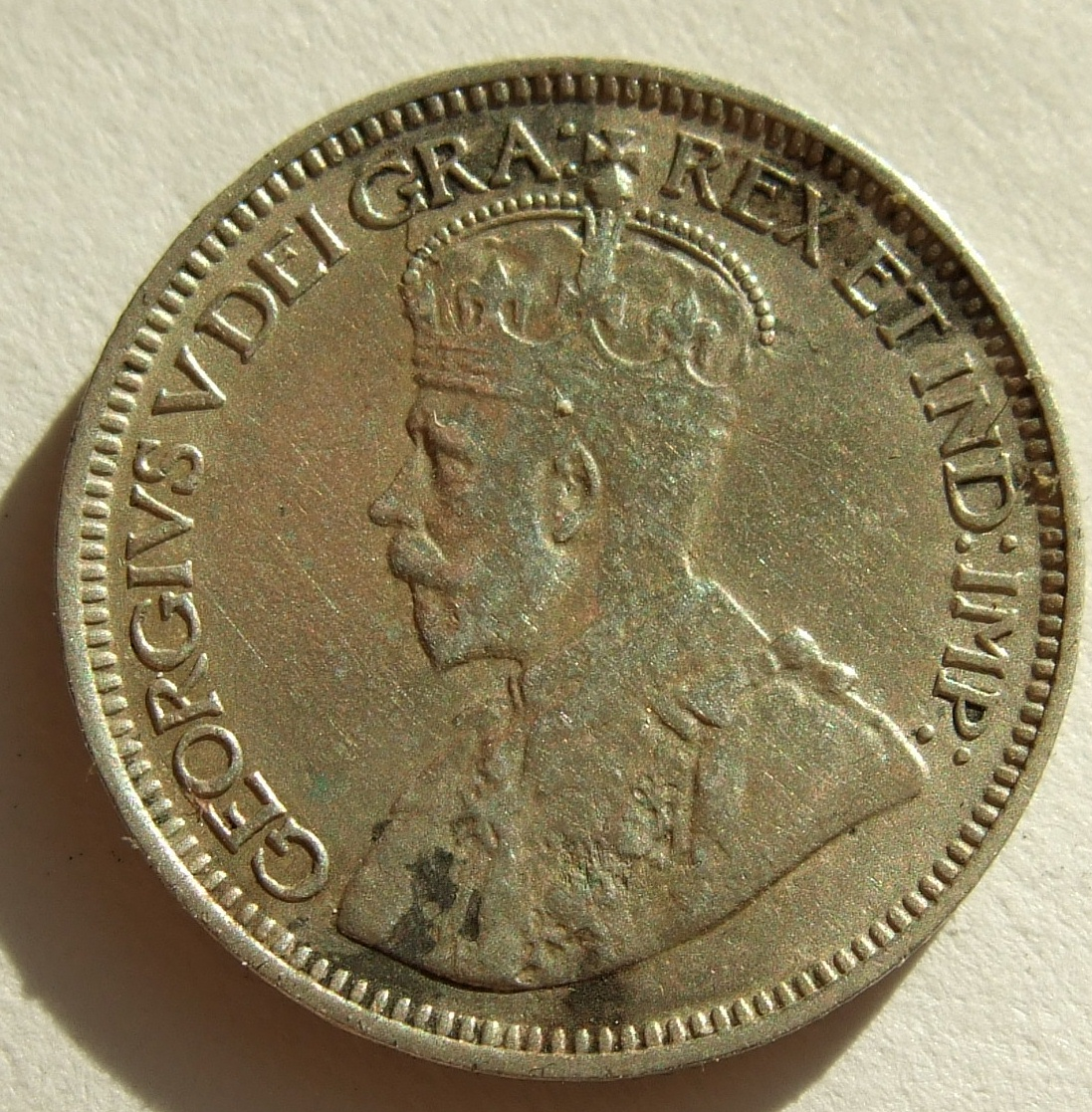
Obverse of a 1917 Canadian 10-cent piece

In 1920, the fineness of the silver coins was changed from .925 fine silver to .800 fine silver, and the size of the cent was reduced. In 1921, the last silver 5¢ coins were struck. These are extremely rare, numbering less than 400. These were replaced in 1922 by a larger nickel coin, copying an earlier change in the United States, and building on the fact that Canada was the world's leading source of nickel ore.

There are a few scarce dates, especially the 1925 and the 1926. There are two types of the 1926: the "near 6" type, which has the tail of the 6 lower down and near to the maple leaf, and the rarer "far 6" type. The 1921 50¢ is also an extremely rare coin. It is the rarest of the King George V series.

The first Canadian silver $1 coin was issued as a commemorative coin in 1935 to commemorate King George V's Silver Jubilee. The portrait of the King on this coin was the same as that of the coins of several other countries. This coin also bears the famous coureur des bois design, which was designed by Emanuel Hahn. This coin, and others issued since with this reverse design, have the nickname of "voyageur dollars".

==== 1936 dot coinage ====
King George V died on January 20, 1936, and was succeeded by King Edward VIII. Because his abdication occurred before production of any Canadian coinage with his likeness could commence, no Canadian coins bear his image.

In 1937, there was a pressing demand for 1¢, 10¢, and 25¢ coins, but, as the Royal Canadian Mint was waiting for new tools and matrices to arrive from the Royal Mint, the decision was made to strike coins dated 1936, but a dot would be added in the area near the date to indicate that the coins were struck in 1937. The 1¢ and 10¢ coins with the dot are exceedingly rare; so rare, in fact, that only four or five specimens are known. In 2004, a "dot cent", as they are sometimes called, sold at auction for $207,000. The one-cent coin was sold again in the Canadiana sale for $400,000, while an example of the ten-cent piece with the dot sold for $184,000. The 25¢ coin, while not as rare as the one-cent and ten-cent pieces, is still a very difficult coin to find.

==== Gold circulation coins ====
Gold coins for circulation were issued from 1912 to 1914 only (earlier rejected "for fear of committing a breach of the Royal Prerogative"), in $5 and $10 denominations, though sovereigns, to British standards, were issued in small quantities for some years. The minting of gold coins for circulation ceased due to the onset of the First World War, when the government of Canada recovered the majority of circulating gold coins to finance the war. Reissue plans were dropped in 1928. According to the Mint, a large quantity of the 1912–1914 gold coins were stored by the Bank of Canada for over 75 years. In 2012, the Mint offered 30,000 coins from the collection for sale to the public through its retail channels and stated that it would melt and refine the remainder of the 245,000 coins to sell the gold content.

Year	Denomination	Mintage	For sale by the Mint in 2012
1912	$5	165,680	
1913	$5	98,832	
1914	$5	31,122	
Subtotal	$5	295,634	5,761
1912	$10	74,759	
1913	$10	149,232	
1914	$10	140,068	
Subtotal	$10	364,059	24,239
Total	$5, $10	659,693 (Note: Of the 659,693 coins minted, 245,000 were held by the Bank of Canada until 2012, at which time 30,000 hand selected specimens were offered for sale by the Royal Canadian Mint, and the rest reportedly melted.)	30,000

=== King George VI coinage ===
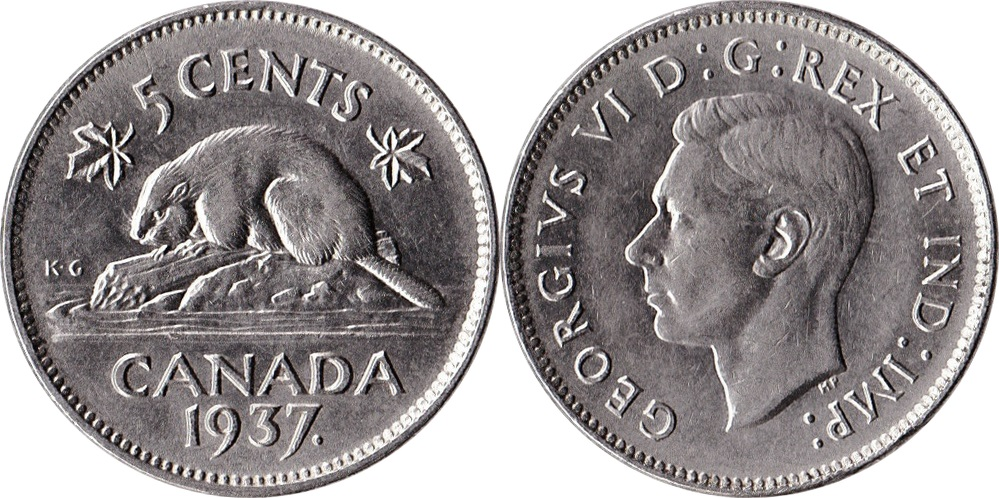
George VI 5¢ coin of 1937

In late 1937, the tools and matrices finally arrived from London, so the issue of the new coins of the reign of King George VI was struck immediately. The coins' current designs date from this period. The coins were as follows:

- 1¢: A twig with two maple leaves (Designer: George Kruger-Gray)
- 5¢: A beaver sitting on a rock and log (Designer: George Kruger-Gray)
- 10¢: The famous Nova Scotian racing schooner Bluenose (Designer: Emanuel Hahn)
- 25¢: A caribou's head (Designer: Emanuel Hahn)
- 50¢: The Coat-of-Arms of Canada (Designer: George Kruger-Gray)
- $1: Voyageur (Designer: Emanuel Hahn)

There was also a silver $1 that was issued in 1939 to commemorate the Royal Visit. The obverse has the usual portrait of George VI while the reverse depicts the Canadian Houses of Parliament in Ottawa. This was also designed by Emanuel Hahn.

During World War II, the demand for nickel for the war effort was great enough for the 5¢ coin to be issued in tombac instead.

While all Canadian George VI coins remain legal tender, the nickels are the only remaining George VI coinage in any nation that have been neither demonetized nor effectively withdrawn from circulation due to precious metal content (or, in the case of the penny, been withdrawn from circulation).

==== 1947 maple leaf coinage ====
Through 1947 the George VI coins bore the inscription Georgius VI D:G: Rex et Ind:Imp: ("Georgius VI, Dei gratia, Rex et Indiae Imperator", or 'George VI, by the grace of God, King and Emperor of India'). As India became independent that year as the Dominion of India and the Dominion of Pakistan, "Emperor of India" needed to be dropped from the coinage. However, there was a demand for coinage. While waiting for the new tools and matrices to arrive from the Royal Mint, the decision was made to strike 1947-dated coinage, but a maple leaf symbol would be added next to the date to indicate that the coins were struck in 1948.

The silver $1 exists in two types: "tall 7" and "short 7". The voyageur $1 is also the rarest coin. The 1¢ is the most common coin. The 1¢ exists as two varieties, "blunt 7" and "pointed 7". The blunt 7 is scarcer and thus more valuable. The upper part of the 7 near the maple twig is slightly blunted compared to the normally found pointed variety. The pointed 7 is the same as used on the 1947 regular-issue 1¢. The 50¢ coin also exists with two "7" varieties. While fairly scarce, the curved left (or straight) 7 is much more common than the curved right 7. The regular 1947 50¢ coins also came with left and right curved 7 numerals. These 1947 varieties without the maple leaf are similarly valued except for the curved right 7 in extremely high grade.

The 1947 maple leaf 5¢, 10¢, and 25¢ do not have notable varieties and are all fairly common coins.

==== King George VI coinage (1948–1952) ====
The new tools and matrices arrived from London, so the issuing of the maple leaf coinage ceased as a result. The obverse of the coins is inscribed Georgius VI Dei gratia Rex ('George VI by the grace of God, King'). During the issue of this coinage, a commemorative silver $1 was struck in 1949 to commemorate Newfoundland becoming the tenth province of Canada. The 1948 coins are very scarce, especially the 50¢ and the silver $1. This is due to the slow delivery of the modified tools and matrices from London.

In this coinage, there are several notable varieties. The first of these is the 1950 "no lines in 0" 50¢ coin. The most famous variety of this series is the "Arnprior dollar", which has one and a half waterlines near the bow of the canoe instead of the normal three waterlines. This variety is named after the town of Arnprior, Ontario, where this variety was discovered.

=== Queen Elizabeth II coinage ===
==== Obverse ====
Several series of coins have been issued under the reign of Elizabeth II, including the current series. There have been four different obverse portraits of the Queen used on Canadian coinage, with new portraits introduced in 1953, 1965, 1990 and 2003.

The first was used for the 1953 to 1964 coins, which featured an effigy of the Queen designed by Mary Gillick, with a wreath of laurel in the Queen's hair. In 1965, a new obverse was sculpted by Arnold Machin, showing a more mature Queen wearing a tiara. The legend on the obverse was also modified, by shortening the phrase Dei Gratia to "D.G." to save space. These two versions of the Queen's portraits were designed by the British Royal Mint, and were similar to those used on British, Australian and New Zealander coinage.

The 1990 and 2003 portraits were designed by Canadian artists, the 1990 effigy by Dora dePedery-Hunt and the 2003 effigy by Susanna Blunt, and are unique to Canadian coinage.

==== Other aspects ====
In 1959, the reverse of the 50-cent coin was redesigned. In 1957, the coat of arms of Canada was simplified. The Queen had suggested that the Tudor crown be replaced by the crown of Edward the Confessor. The changes were reflected in the 1959 50-cent coin. The new reverse was modelled and designed by Thomas Shingles, updating the Canadian coat-of-arms.

In 1968, the 10-cent coin and higher denominations were debased, their silver alloy being replaced by nickel. The dime of 1969 has two varieties, a large 9 (rare) and small 9 (common). In 1973, a quarter commemorating the Royal Canadian Mounted Police was issued; it also has two varieties: a large bust (rare) and small bust (common).

In 1987, the $1 coin, colloquially known as the "loonie", was introduced, replacing the Voyageur dollar with a new design, new colour, and smaller size. This coin also replaced the $1 bill, which was subsequently withdrawn from circulation by the Bank of Canada. In February 1996, the $2 coin, or toonie, was released; it currently has three varieties. The toonie replaced the $2 bill.

In 2000, all coins below $1 were changed to steel with copper or nickel plating; in 2012, this was extended to the $1 and $2 coins as well. The 50-cent coin is regularly minted but not in large quantities; it is very rare to come across this coin in circulation, although an unsuccessful attempt was made by the Mint to promote the use of the coin when a special edition was released in 2002 marking the 50th anniversary of Elizabeth II ascending the throne.

Coins issued in 2002 do not have the usual mint date, which normally appears on the reverse side. Instead, the 2002 coins have a commemorative double-date on the obverse side: "1952–2002", to commemorate the 50th anniversary of the Queen's reign.

=== King Charles III coinage ===
The Royal Canadian Mint stated that circulating coinage featuring Charles III would be released in the fourth quarter of 2023.

The portrait of Charles III was designed by Steven Rosati, who was one of 350 artists to submit an entry to the Royal Canadian Mint for the portrait design. The first strike of coins bearing the design were loonies pressed after the unveiling of the design on November 14, 2023; they were circulated in December 2023.

== Other numismatic details ==
=== Special edition coins ===
Although the Mint has produced many special edition coins in recent years, Canada does have a history of such coins. From 1943 to 1945, the Mint issued the "Victory nickel" to promote the Canadian war effort. In 1951 a circulating commemorative coin, a 5-cent piece for the bicentennial of the discovery of the element nickel, was released. In 1967, all Canadian coins were issued with special reverses to celebrate the Canadian Centennial. Six years later, a "Mountie quarter" was issued in 1973 to commemorate the centennial of the Royal Canadian Mounted Police.

In recent years, the Mint has issued several series of coins with special reverses. Most of them have been 25¢ coins, particularly in the years 1999–2001. There were also versions of the $2 coin commemorating the founding of Nunavut, and another with a family of polar bears; there have been several variants of the $1 coin, one of which featured the Canadian peacekeepers' monument in Ottawa to commemorate the award of the Nobel Peace Prize. A commemorative Terry Fox $1 coin began circulating on April 4, 2005.

On October 21, 2004, the Royal Canadian Mint unveiled a 25¢ poppy coin. This coin features a red poppy (Papaver rhoeas) that is coloured red, embedded in the centre of a maple leaf above a banner reading "Remember – Souvenir". It is the world's first coloured coin. While some countries' mints have produced colourized coins for market to collectors, this is the first colourized coin in general circulation in the world.

The Mint states that, with normal wear and tear, the colour should remain for a number of years, although this claim was quickly disproved. The colouration compounds are attached to the metal on a specially prepared 'dimpled' section of the coin and seem to come off easily if deliberately rubbed. The coin will retain its full value even if the red poppy has worn off or been removed; however, it is now expected that fully coloured specimens will become collectible in the future.

In an isolated incident in the United States these coins were briefly reported as a possible 'spy tool' by some US Defense Contractors unfamiliar with the odd-seeming coin and raised espionage warnings until the situation was clarified.

On May 4, 2005, the Mint unveiled a new "Victory nickel", reminiscent of the original issued during the Second World War. The new coin commemorated the 60th anniversary of the Allied victory in World War II. A mintage of 59,258,000 Victory nickels were produced and treated as regular circulation coins.

In 2005, 25¢ and $5 coins commemorating the centennial of two of Canada's provinces were released: the coin for Alberta represents oil exploration in that province; the coin for Saskatchewan depicts a singing meadowlark and a grain elevator. Later the same year, the Mint later issued a Year Of The Veteran coin to honour military veterans, again in the 25¢ denomination.

On February 21, 2007, the mint announced that they would be producing a 100-kilogram coin the size of a large pizza with a face value of $1 million. This new coin bears the highest face value in the world, using approximately $2 million of 99.999% pure bullion, and five were produced and sold to investors.

The Alberta Centennial coin

$1M 100 kg gold coin

=== Urban legends ===
Several urban legends and other false information have circulated regarding Canadian coinage.

- The centre can pop out of a toonie. This is in fact true, but only for coins struck in 1996. Many toonies in the first shipment of the coins were defective, and could separate if struck hard or frozen, as the centre piece would shrink more than the outside. This problem was quickly corrected, and the initial wave of "toonie popping" blew over a few months after the coin's introduction.
- The 50¢ piece is no longer minted and/or has been withdrawn from circulation. The 50¢ coin circulates so little that many people have never personally seen or handled one. Shop proprietors have been known to refuse to accept them as payment because they do not recognize them as Canadian currency. However, the RCM continues to produce the 50¢ coin annually for coin collections such as the Uncirculated, Specimen, and Proof Sets. Although the RCM does produce the coin in small numbers (in 2005, the mintage for the coins was 200,000, and the coins were not produced for circulation in 2003 and 2004); most of them are purchased by coin collectors. The remainder go to banks, though most do not give them out unless the customer specifically requests so. Given enough notice, any bank should be able to obtain them in a significant quantity for their customers. The 50¢ coin is also commonly handed out as regular change at some Canada Post locations. An attempt at widening the circulation of the 50-cent piece was made in 2002 with the release of a specially designed coin marking the Golden Jubilee of Queen Elizabeth II, which was circulated through the Laura Secord Chocolates store chain in Canada.
- The crown is wrong in the Queen's portrait. When the new coin portrait was first issued in 1990 (see above), a legend surfaced that the artist had simply added the image of a crown to a portrait of the Queen, and that she was never meant to be seen wearing that headgear. This is false; she posed personally for the portrait wearing one of her usual crowns.

=== Effigies ===
1953 – The coronation of a new monarch meant a new effigy. Due to an issue with the portrait model for the new Queen Elizabeth, two obverse varieties, termed the "no shoulder fold" and the "shoulder fold" obverses were found in circulation during 1953. The portrait model was prepared in England by sculptor Mary Gillick. The relief of this model was too high. This affected the new effigy because the centre portion containing two lines on the shoulder (representing a fold in the Queen's gown) did not strike up well on the coins. This obverse had been termed the "no shoulder strap" variety by numismatists.

Later in 1953, Mint authorities decided to correct the defects in the obverse design. Thomas Shingles, chief engraver of the RCM, was summoned to lower the relief of the model. The result was that he had strengthened the shoulder and hair detail. This revised obverse (often called "the shoulder strap" variety due to the resemblance of the lines to a strap) was introduced before the end of the year. This was accepted as the standard obverse. The no shoulder fold obverse was used to produce some of the 1954 cents for the proof-like sets and a small quantity of 1955 cents for circulation. The 1955 no shoulder fold variety is the most desired by collectors.

1965 – Starting in 1965, the effigy of the Queen underwent the first of three changes. This new obverse featured the Queen with more mature facial features. The wearing of a tiara was the other aspect of the new effigy.

1990 – A new obverse debuted with the Queen now wearing a diamond diadem and jewellery. Although the effigy changed in 2003, this portrait with a diadem is still used on all Chinese Lunar New Year coins.

2003 – To commemorate the 50th anniversary of the coronation of the Queen, a new obverse was introduced. The unique feature of this effigy is that the Queen is without headdress. This marked the first time that the effigy of a monarch did not wear headdress since Elizabeth's father, King George VI, a half-century earlier.

=== Mint mark ===
In an effort to build the brand, the Royal Canadian Mint implemented a policy in which all its circulation and collector coins would bear a new mint mark. Unveiled at the Canadian Numismatic Association convention in Niagara Falls, Ontario, in July 2006, the mint mark was a reproduction of the Royal Canadian Mint logo.

The first circulation coin to bear the new mint mark was the 10th anniversary $2 coin, illustrated by Tony Bianco. This meant that the "P" mint mark which recognized the plating technology would no longer be used. For collectors, the first collector coin to feature the new mint mark was the Snowbirds coin and stamp set.

=== Records ===
In the Charlton Standard Catalogue of Canadian Coins, the 1911 $1 coin is valued at $1,250,000. There are only 2 known specimens in sterling silver, and one specimen in lead. One of the silver specimens and the lead specimen are located at the Bank of Canada's currency museum, while the other is in a private collection. The rarity stems from the fact the federal government chose not to proceed with producing a "silver dollar" in 1911. The 1911 coin sets were originally planned to include the $1, but the sets came with an empty gap where the $1 coin was supposed to be. Canada didn't issue a $1 circulation coin until 1935, when it issued a circulating dollar commemorating George V's Silver Jubilee.

Among numismatists, the 1921 50-cent coin is considered the rarest Canadian circulation coin and has gained the moniker "the king of Canadian coins". A high-grade specimen sold in 2023 for $160,480 dollars. Despite a mintage of 206,398 coins, there was a very low demand for 50-cent coins in the 1920s and so they were not circulated. When demand for the coins returned in 1929, mint master John Honeyford Campbell ordered the coins melted and re-struck to avoid confusion or accusations of counterfeiting. Approximately 75 of the coins are thought to have survived, these being a mix of specimen set and circulation set coins sold to visitors to the mint in 1921.

=== Victory nickel ===
(Tombac 1943–1944; steel 1944–1946)

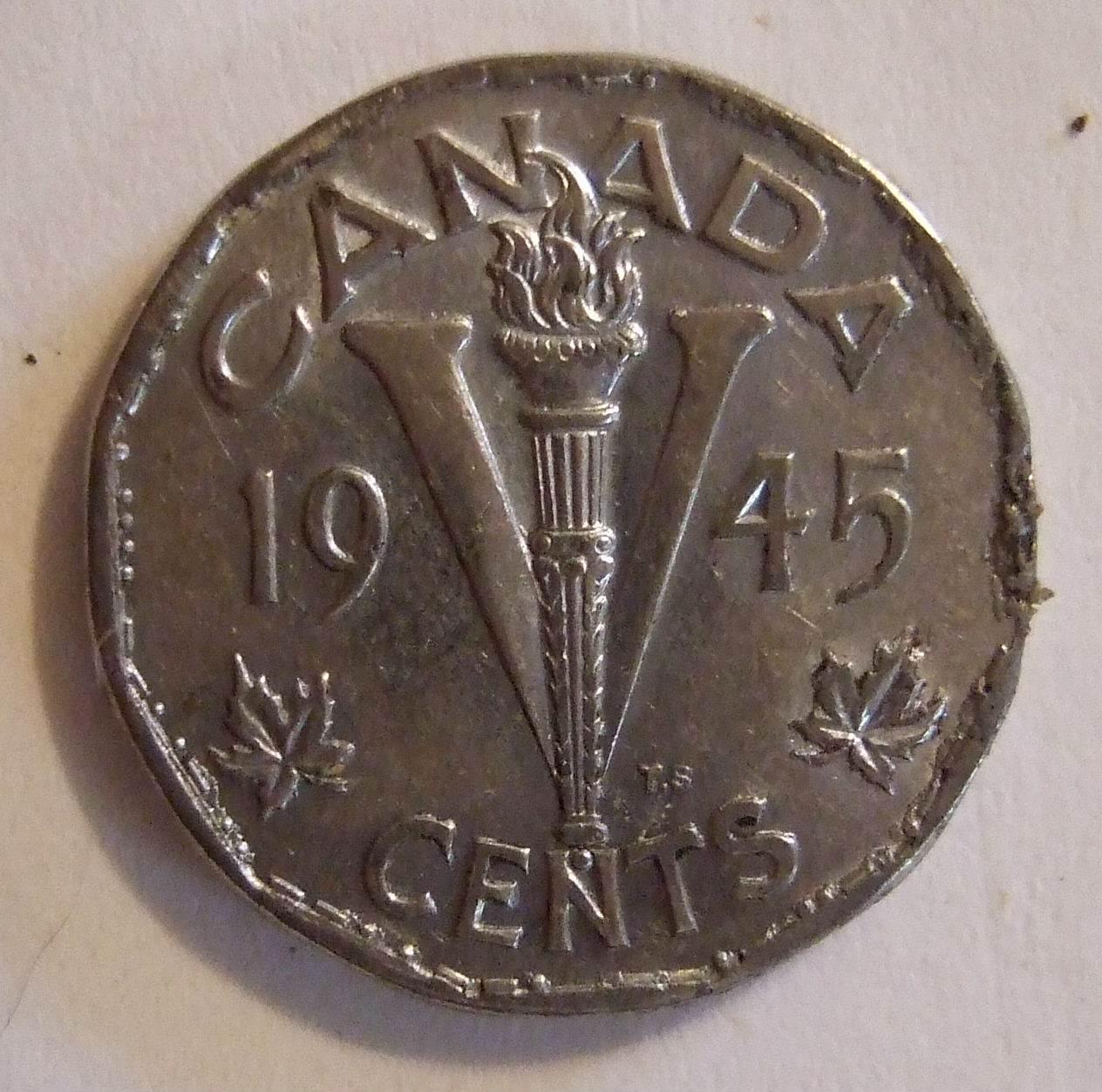
Reverse of the victory nickel, as minted in 1945

From 1943 to 1946, the mint produced 5-cent coins of the "Victory" type to help stimulate Canada's war effort. These coins were designed by Thomas Shingles and incorporated the famous V sign from Winston Churchill, along with a torch symbolizing the sacrifices made during the war. The edge of the coin was engraved with a Morse code message spelling out "We Win When We Work Willingly".

In 1942, the mint began producing nickels using tombac, an 88% copper, 12% zinc alloy. Previous nickels were made of 100% pure nickel. This change was made due to high demand for the element in war production.

The design was partially reused in 2020, appearing on special coloured and uncoloured 2-dollar coins commemorating the 75th anniversary of the end of the war.
