= Five-dollar coin (Canada) =

Discontinued Canadian coin (1912–1914)

Five-dollar gold piece
- Canada
- Value: 5 CAD
- Mass: 8.36 g
- Diameter: 21.59 mm
- Thickness: 1.82 mm
- Edge: Reeded
- Orientation: Medal alignment
- Composition: 90% Au, 10% Cu
- Years of minting: 1912–1914

Obverse
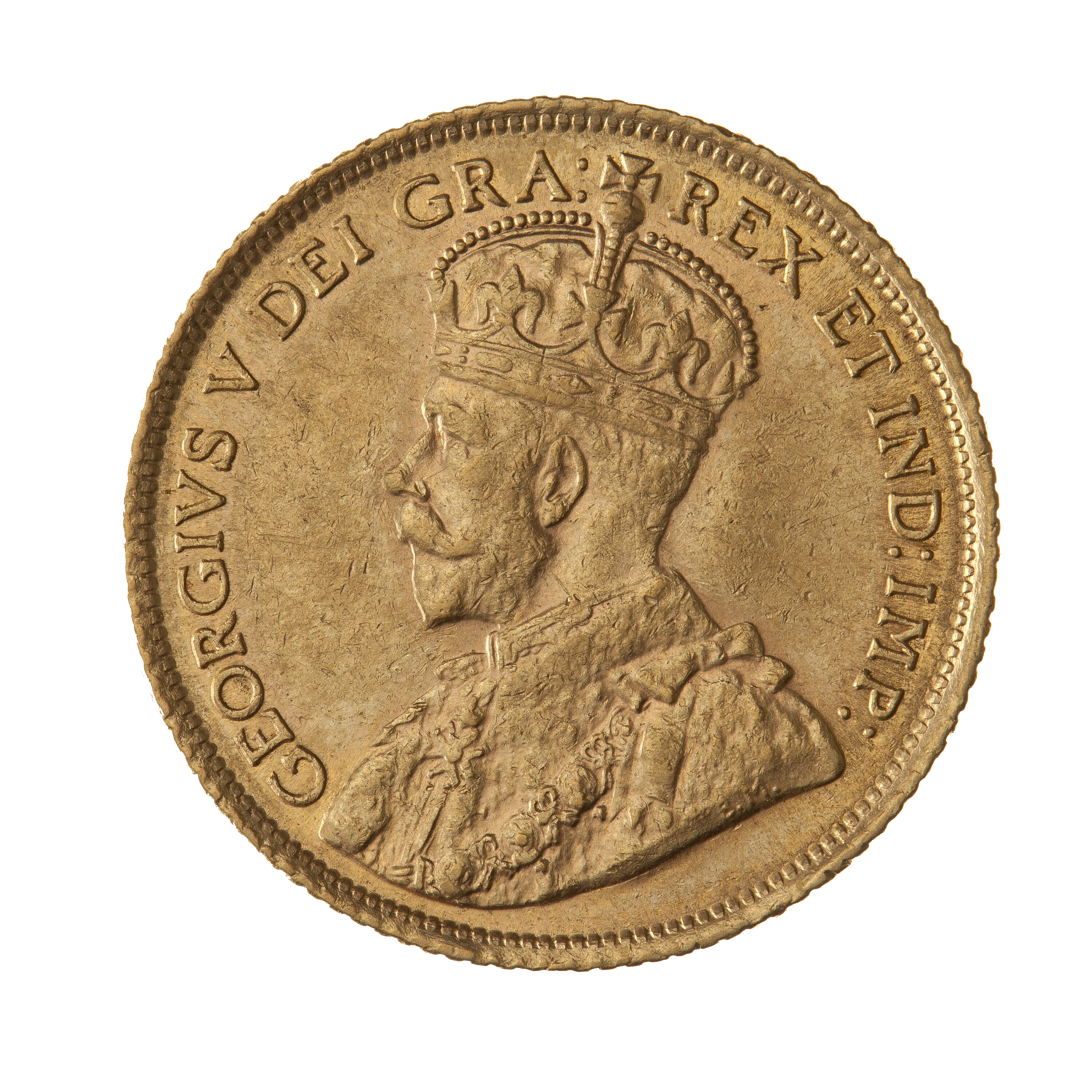
- Design: King George V
- Designer: Bertram Mackennal

Reverse
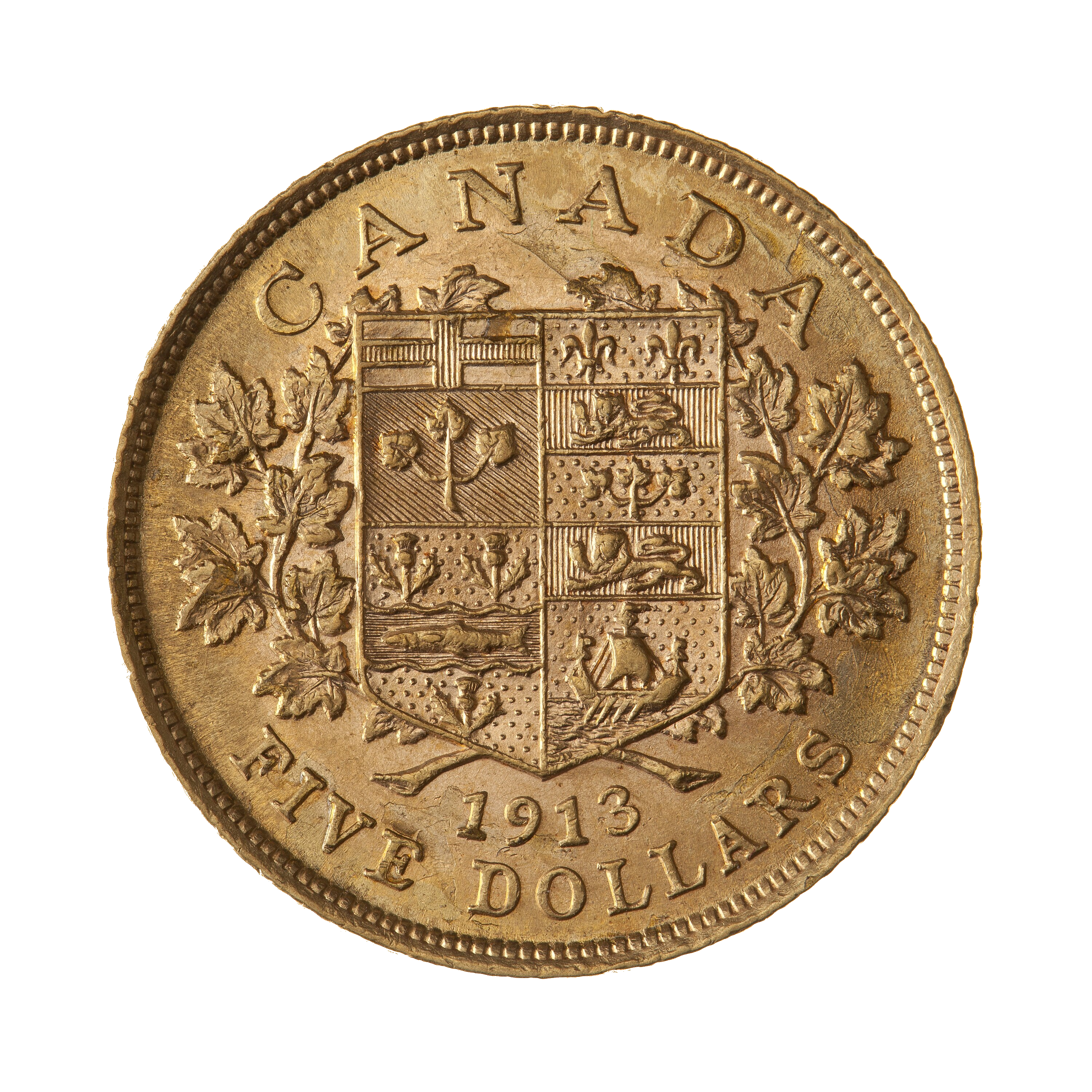
- Design: Shield from the Canadian coat of arms
- Designer: W.H.J. Blakemore

The five-dollar gold piece was a gold Canadian coin that was struck for circulation from 1912 to 1914, consisting of 90% gold and 10% copper.

== History ==
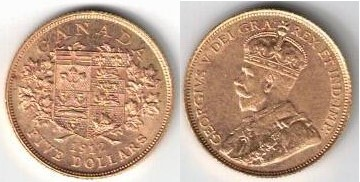
Canadian 5 dollar gold coin

The Currency Act of 1910 provided for gold coins to be issued in denominations of $2.50, $5, $10 and $20. However, the Ottawa Branch of the Royal Mint only issued $5 and $10 pieces, with gold patterns first struck in 1911. The $5 piece is the same size as the US $5 half eagle minted between 1840 and 1929, and contains the same amount of gold. The Currency Act of 1910 also made US half-eagles, eagles, and double eagles coined after January 18, 1837, legal tender in Canada.

According to the Royal Canadian Mint, much of the gold for the coins came from the Klondike region in 1912, and from Ontario in the other years. Production was halted in 1914, following the outbreak of the First World War. In 1926, banknotes issued by the Canadian Government became redeemable in gold once again. As a result, patterns were produced in bronze for $5 and $10 pieces, in anticipation that the denominations would again be produced for circulation. The shield from the Canadian coat of arms was updated to reflect the new arms. However, no $5 and $10 pieces were produced.

Year	Mintage
1912	165,680
1913	98,832
1914	31,122

== Public sale ==
More than 245,000 $5 and $10 pieces were held by the Bank of Canada until 2012, when 30,000 of the coins graded "About Uncirculated" or higher were offered for sale to the public. The remaining coins were to be melted. When the sale was announced, the Governor of the Bank of Canada, Mark Carney, noted "Though precious metal coins are no longer part of daily commerce, Canada's first gold circulation coins endure as important symbols of our nation's proud heritage."
