= Canadian twenty-cent coin =

Discontinued Canadian coin (1858)

Twenty-cent piece
- Canada
- Value: 0.20 CAD
- Mass: 4.648 g
- Diameter: 23.3 mm
- Thickness: 1.2 mm
- Edge: Reeded
- Orientation: Variable alignment
- Composition: 92.5% Ag, 7.5% Cu
- Years of minting: 1858

Obverse
- Design: Queen Victoria
- Designer: Leonard Charles Wyon

Reverse
- Design: Value and date, surrounded by wreath, topped by crown
- Designer: Leonard Charles Wyon

The twenty-cent piece was a Canadian coin struck by the Royal Mint of the United Kingdom for the Province of Canada in 1858. It consisted of 92.5% silver, and 7.5% copper. A total of 730,392 were struck.

== History ==
With the passing of the Currency Act on 1 August 1854, the Province of Canada introduced a decimal currency. Coins were struck in 1-, 5-, 10- and 20-cent denominations. The new Canadian dollar was equal in value to the New Brunswick dollar, which was introduced in 1852.

In order to accommodate transactions involving the Nova Scotian pound, the Province of Canada chose to issue a twenty-cent coin, which was the equivalent to a shilling in Nova Scotian currency. However, no shilling coin was issued by Nova Scotia, and the British shilling was worth 20 percent more than a Nova Scotian shilling. The twenty-cent coin was confused with both British shillings and American quarters, and was therefore not minted beyond 1858. The coins were withdrawn from circulation and, from 1885 on, returned to the Royal Mint to be recoined as 25-cent pieces.

== Varieties ==
There are several known varieties of the twenty-cent coin, primarily involving the letter I on the obverse in the words VICTORIA, GRATIA, or DEI. The majority of twenty-cent coins have a coinage alignment; however, approximately 25 percent were struck with a medal alignment.
