= Ten-dollar coin (Canada) =

Discontinued Canadian coin (1912–1914)

Ten-dollar gold piece
- Canada
- Value: 10 CAD
- Mass: 16.72 g
- Diameter: 26.92 mm
- Thickness: 2.08 mm
- Edge: Reeded
- Orientation: Medal alignment
- Composition: 90% Au, 10% Cu
- Years of minting: 1912–1914

Obverse
- Design: King George V
- Designer: Bertram Mackennal

Reverse
- Design: Shield from the Canadian coat of arms
- Designer: W.H.J. Blakemore

The ten-dollar piece was a gold Canadian coin that was struck for circulation from 1912 to 1914, consisting of 90% gold and 10% copper.

== History ==
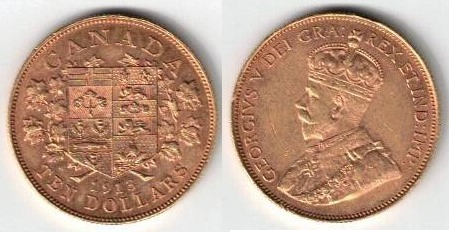
Canadian 10 dollar gold coin

The Currency Act of 1910 provided for gold coins to be issued in denominations of $2.50, $5, $10 and $20. However, the Ottawa Branch of the Royal Mint only issued $5 and $10 pieces, with gold patterns first struck in 1911. The $10 coin is the same size as the US eagle minted between 1838 and 1933, and contains the same amount of gold. The Currency Act of 1910 also made US half-eagles, eagles, and double eagles coined after January 18, 1837, legal tender in Canada.

The Royal Canadian Mint notes that much of the gold for the $5 and $10 coins minted in 1912 came from the Klondike region, while those minted in 1913 and 1914 contain gold mined in Ontario. Production was halted in 1914, following the outbreak of the First World War. In 1926, banknotes issued by the Canadian Government became redeemable in gold once again. As a result, patterns were produced in bronze for $5 and $10 pieces, in anticipation that the denominations would again be produced for circulation. The shield from the Canadian coat of arms was updated to reflect the new arms. However, no $5 and $10 pieces were produced.

Year	Mintage
1912	74,759
1913	149,232
1914	140,068

== Public Sale ==
More than 245,000 $5 and $10 pieces were held by the Bank of Canada until 2012, when 30,000 of the coins graded "About Uncirculated" or higher were offered for sale to the public. The remaining coins were to be melted. When the sale was announced, Mark Carney, then Governor of the Bank of Canada, noted "Though precious metal coins are no longer part of daily commerce, Canada’s first gold circulation coins endure as important symbols of our nation’s proud heritage."
