= Voyageur dollar =

Discontinued Canadian coin (1935–1986)

- Canada
- Value: 1 CAD
- Mass: 15.62 g
- Diameter: 1935-1967 36 mm 1968-1987 32.15 mm
- Thickness: 2.88 mm
- Edge: Milled
- Composition: 1935–1967; 80% Ag, 20% Cu; 1968–1987; 99.9% Ni
- Years of minting: 1935–1987
- Catalog number: –

Obverse
- Design: King George V (MacKennal effigy; 1935-36); George VI (Paget effigy; 1937-52); Elizabeth II (Gillick effigy; 1953-63); Elizabeth II (Machin effigy; 1965-87)
- Designer: Bertram Mackennal; Humphrey Paget; Mary Gillick; Arnold Machin

Reverse
- Design: Voyageur and an aboriginal travelling by canoe
- Designer: Emanuel Hahn

The voyageur dollar is a coin of Canada that was struck for circulation from 1935 through 1986. Two major versions of the coin were produced: a larger, silver coin (80% silver) from 1935 to 1968, and a smaller, nickel version from 1968 through 1986. In 1987, the coin was replaced by the loonie. Like all of Canada's discontinued coins, the voyageur dollar coins remain legal tender.

The reverse design of the coin features an Indigenous man and a French-Canadian voyageur paddling a canoe, with an island with two trees in the background. Vertical lines in the background represent the Northern Lights, and bundles in the canoe feature the initials H.B., representing the Hudson's Bay Company. This image represents a romanticized version of Canada's early history with the fur trade, and came to be known as the "voyageur" design. The design was made by Canadian Emmanuel Hahn, whose initials appear on the coin (EH at left under canoe).

== History ==
=== Production ===
On May 4, 1910, the Canadian government passed an amendment to the Currency Act (Bill 195) which, among other things, called for the requirement of a Canadian silver dollar. James Bonar, Deputy Master of the Royal Mint, had ordered the master dies for this new dollar on November 10, 1910. Production of the dies was delayed, and they were not delivered to the Mint until nearly a year later. By the time the dies arrived, Sir Robert Borden had won his Canadian election, and cancelled the production of the silver dollar. While no official reason was given from the Borden government about the cancellation, a letter from Bonar attributes the coin's removal to the absence of a reference to God (Dei gratia rex), which created controversy among Canadians at the time. The obverse dies, featuring the bust of King George V, would still be preserved until 1936, used with the first silver dollars to enter circulation. Three trial strikes of silver dollars were produced in 1911 by the Royal Mint in London: two struck in silver, and one in lead. One of the silver coins, owned by the Royal Mint Museum, has been loaned to the Bank of Canada since 1976, while the lead coin was discovered during a move in 1977. The two were put into the National Currency Collection of the Bank of Canada, and have been on display in the Bank of Canada Museum since 1980.

=== George V, Silver Jubilee Commemorative Coin ===
In 1935, a commemorative silver dollar was struck for the Silver Jubilee of George V (the 25th year of his reign). The obverse featured a portrait of the King with the special Latin motto "Georgius Rex Imperator anno regni XXV" (English: George V, King, Emperor, regnal year 25) around the edge.

The reverse features the "Voyageur" design by Emanuel Hahn. This coin was the first Canadian 1-dollar coin issued for circulation, and marked the beginning of silver Canadian dollars in circulation, which continued until 1968 when the coin's composition shifted from silver to nickel.

=== Struck in silver ===
The issue was generally considered a success, and beginning in 1936, the silver dollar (in .800 fine silver) was struck more-or-less annually as a regular issue for general circulation, with the same reverse design as in 1935. Although commemorative dollars were struck for circulation for the visit of King George VI in 1939, no regular-issue dollars were struck that year, as well as until the end of World War II in 1945. Thereafter, voyageur dollars were struck each year through 1966, except in years when a commemorative dollar was struck for circulation (e.g. 1939, 1949, 1958, 1964). In 1967, a special "flying goose" design was struck for the Canadian Centennial.

=== Struck in nickel ===
Beginning in 1968, following the 1967 Canadian Centennial series, the voyageur dollar design resumed. It was now struck in pure nickel, following the decision to debase Canada's coinage from silver to nickel. The change to this harder metal led to the diameter of the coin being reduced from 36 mm to 32 mm, as it made minting considerably easier. From then on, the series was only interrupted for circulating commemorative issues, except for those produced in 1982 (Constitution Acts dollar) and 1984 (Jacques Cartier dollar), where the voyageur design was also produced. It was last struck for circulation in 1986 and for collectors in 1987.

=== Change to the loonie ===
Neither the silver nor nickel dollars circulated well although the Royal Canadian Mint (RCM) saw a need for a circulating dollar coin. Since a one-dollar coin could last 20 years longer than a one-dollar bill, they calculated that they could save up to $250 million in 20 years. To encourage circulation, the size was reduced, the colour was changed, and the one-dollar note was eliminated from circulation.

Originally, the plans called for the voyageur design to be continued on the new gold-coloured dollar coin. However, the set of dies depicting the design was lost in transit between the Ottawa mint to the Winnipeg mint. To eliminate the risk of counterfeiting, an alternate design submitted by Robert-Ralph Carmichael in a 1978 coin design contest, featuring a loon, was used. This became known as the loonie.

== Circulation figures ==
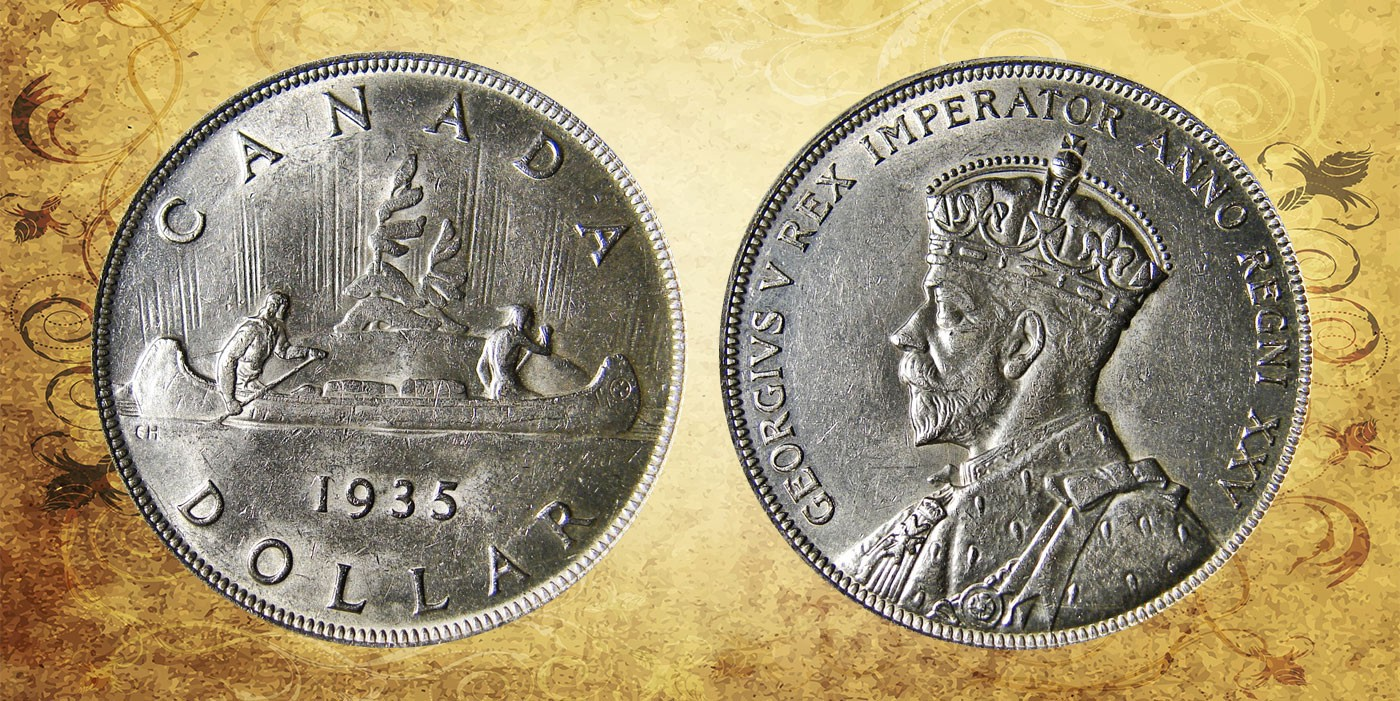
1935 Canadian voyageur dollar, commemorating the Silver Jubilee of George V

=== George V and George VI ===
Year	Mintage (Note: Proof "specimen" strikes were also produced in unknown quantities.)	Notes
1935	428,707	Designed to commemorate the Silver Jubilee of George V.
1936	339,600	
1937	207,406	
1938	90,304	
1939	1,363,816	Designed to commemorate King George VI and Queen Elizabeth's visit to Ottawa.
1945	38,391	
1946	93,055	
1947	65,595 (Note: This figure includes the "straight" and "curved" 7 varieties.)	
1947 ML	21,135	Obverse Ind: Imp: (Latin for 'Emperor of India') removed.
1948	18,780	
1949	672,218	Newfoundland joins Confederation. (Note: The design features the Matthew, sailed by John Cabot when he first arrived in Newfoundland in 1497. Below the ship are the Latin words Floreat Terra Nova, meaning "May the New Found Land flourish".)
1950	261,002	Includes "water line" varieties.
1951	416,395	Includes "water line" varieties.
1952	406,148	Includes "water line" varieties.

=== Elizabeth II ===
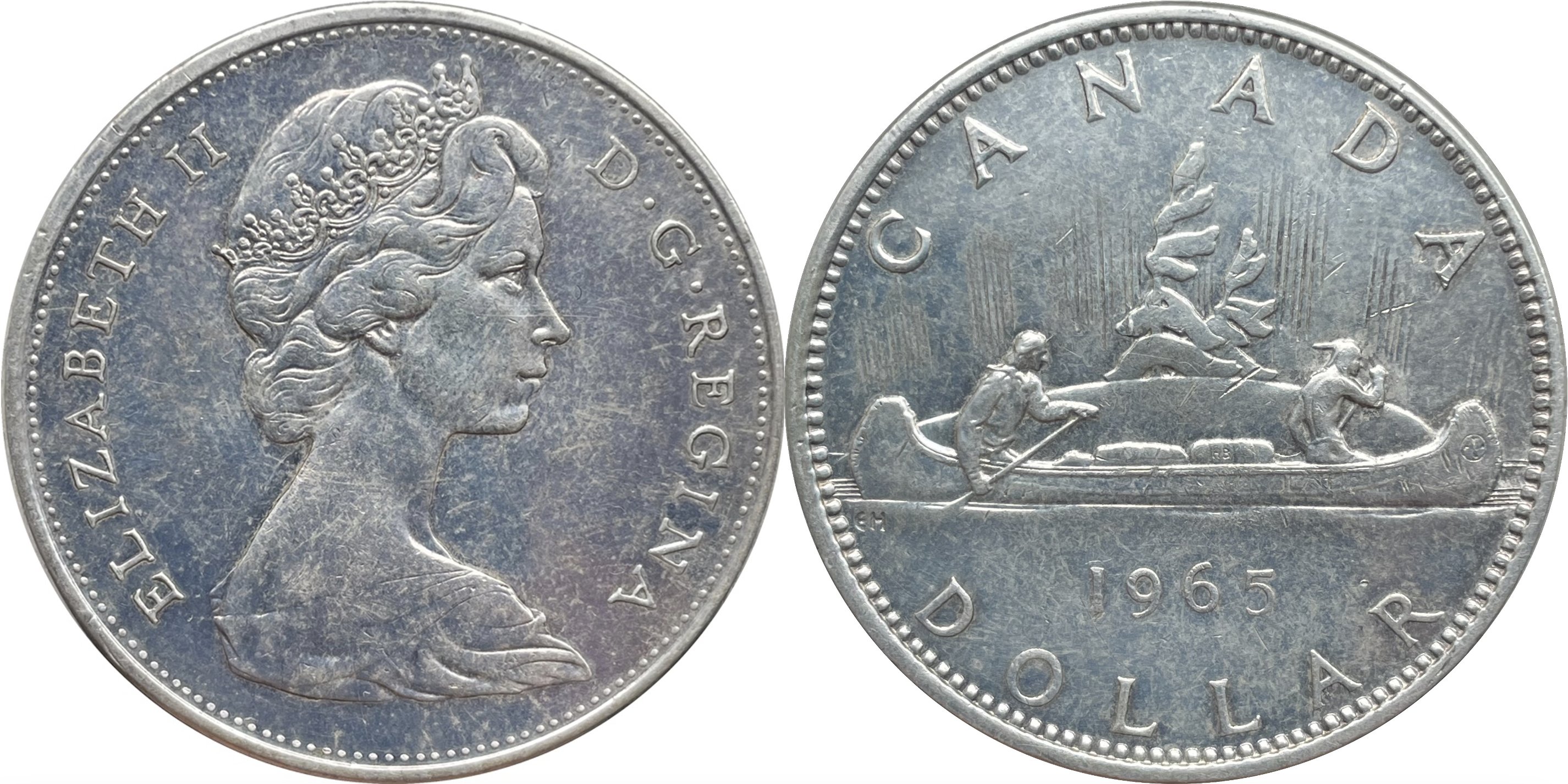
1965 Canadian voyageur dollar with Queen Elizabeth II.

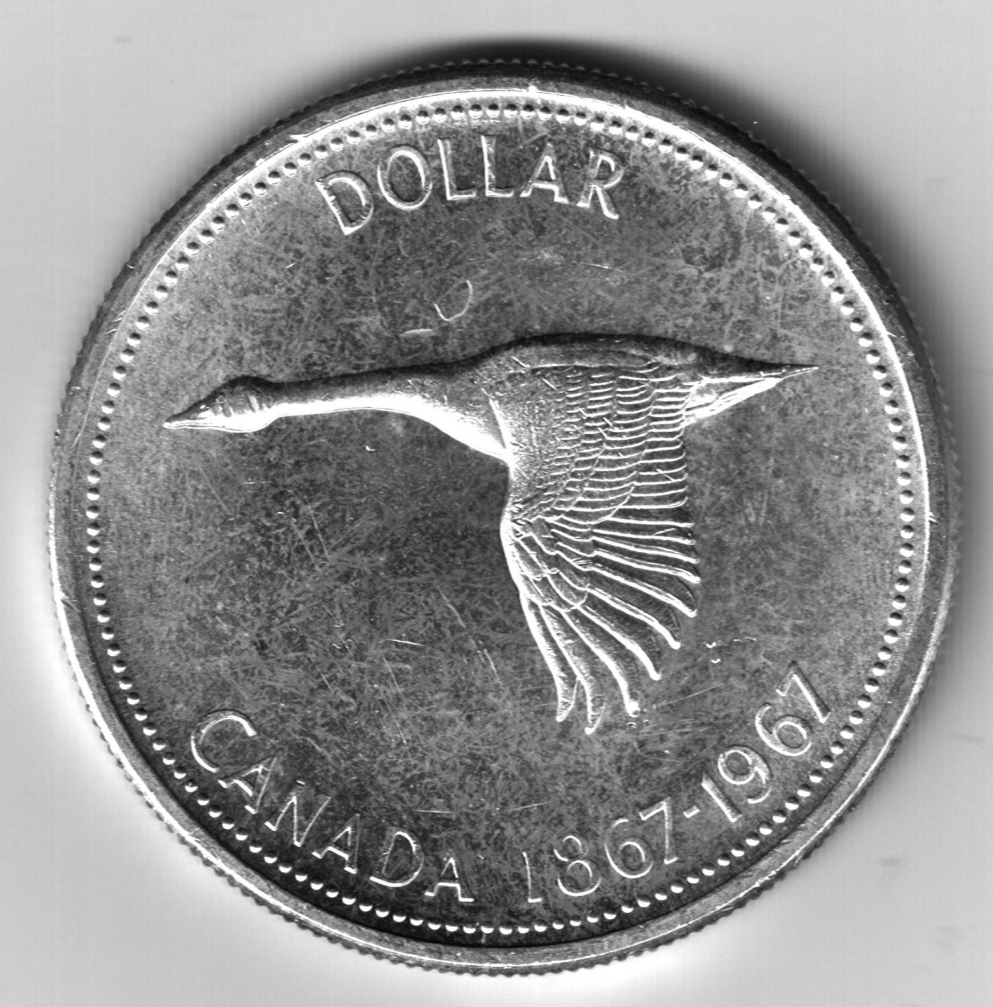
Reverse side of the Canadian Centennial commemorative coin featuring a Canada goose in flight.

Year	Mintage	Notes
1953 No strap	1,074,578	This variety is also called with/without shoulder fold.
1953 Strap	1,074,578	This variety is also called with/without shoulder fold.
1954	246,606	
1955	268,105	Includes "water line" varieties.
1956	209,092	
1957	496,389	Includes "water line" varieties.
1958	3,039,630	100th anniversary of British Columbia. (Note: Designed to commemorate 100 years since both the Cariboo Gold Rush and the creation of British Columbia as a British Crown colony. The design features a totem pole in the foreground, with the Rocky Mountains in the background.)
1959	1,443,502	
1960	1,420,486	
1961	1,262,231	
1962	1,884,789	
1963	4,179,981	
1964	7,296,832	100th anniversary of the Charlottetown and Quebec Conferences. (Note: The design features the French fleur-de-lis, the Irish shamrock, the Scottish thistle, and the English rose.)
1965	10,768,569	2nd obverse portrait
1966	9,912,178	The "small beads" variety is very rare with only 485 reported.
1967	6,767,496	Canada's Centennial: The design features a Canada goose in flight.
1968	5,579,714	
1969	4,809,313	
1970	4,140,058	100th anniversary of the accession of Manitoba. (Note: The design features a prairie crocus, the provincial flower of Manitoba.)
1971	4,260,781	100th anniversary of the accession of British Columbia. (Note: The design features British Columbia's coat of arms, as well as its provincial flower, the dogwood.)
1972	2,676,041	
1973	3,196,452	100th anniversary of the accession of Prince Edward Island. (Note: The design features Province House.)
1974	2,799,363	100th anniversary of Winnipeg. (Note: The design features the number 100, surrounded on top and bottom by lettering "Winnipeg" and "1874–1974 Canada dollar" respectively.)
1975	3,256,000	
1976	2,498,204	
1977	1,393,745	
1978	2,948,488	
1979	2,954,842	
1980	3,291,221	
1981	2,778,900	
1982	1,098,500	Regular "voyageur" issue
1982	9,709,402	Constitution Acts of 1867 and 1982. (Note: The design features a recreation of a painting of the Fathers of Confederation.)
1983	2,267,525	
1984	1,223,486	Regular "voyageur" issue
1984	7,009,323	450th anniversary of Jacques Cartier arriving on the Gaspé Peninsula. (Note: The design features explorer Jacque Cartier in front of a cross with the French coat of arms.)
1985	3,104,092	
1986	3,089,225	
1987	Not circulated	"Prooflike" and "Proof" issues only
