= Dime (Canadian coin) =

Canadian coin worth ten cents

Ten cents
- Canada
- Value: 0.10 Canadian dollar
- Mass: 1.75 g
- Diameter: 18.03 mm
- Thickness: 1.22 mm
- Edge: Milled
- Composition: Nickel-plated steel 92% steel, 5.5% Cu, 2.5% Ni plating
- Years of minting: 1858–present

Obverse
- Design: Charles III, King of Canada
- Designer: Steven Rosati
- Design date: 2023

Reverse
- Design: Bluenose schooner
- Designer: Emanuel Hahn; design based on photographs of the Bluenose
- Design date: 1937

In Canada, a dime is a coin worth ten cents, equal to 1/10 of a Canadian dollar. It has been the physically smallest Canadian coin since 1922; it is smaller even than the penny, despite its higher face value. According to the Royal Canadian Mint, the official national term of the coin is the 10-cent piece, but in practice, the term dime predominates in English-speaking Canada. It is nearly identical in size to the American dime. Unlike its American counterpart, the Canadian dime is magnetic due to a distinct metal composition. From 1968 to 2000, it was composed entirely of nickel, and since 2001, it has consisted of a steel core with plating composed of layers of nickel and copper.

The most prevalent version of the coin features a portrait of Elizabeth II on the obverse, although a new version featuring Charles III was introduced in 2023. The reverse contains a representation of the Bluenose, a famous Canadian schooner. According to the Royal Canadian Mint, "Artist Emanuel Hahn developed his design for the 10-cent coin from photos of the famous Bluenose schooner." The coin is produced by the Royal Canadian Mint at its facility in Winnipeg.

The word dime comes from the French word dîme, meaning 'tithe' or 'tenth part', from the Latin decima [pars].

== Composition and size ==
Years	Mass	Diameter	Composition
1858–1919	2.33 g	18.034 mm	92.5% silver, 7.5% copper
1920–1967	2.33 g	18.034 mm	80% silver, 20% copper
1967–1968	2.33 g	18.03 mm	50% silver, 50% copper
1968–2000	2.07 g	18.03 mm	99.9% nickel
2001–present (Note: Coins dated 1999 and 2000 (P) were made in very low amounts.)	1.75 g	18.03 mm	92.0% steel (AISI 1006 alloy), 5.5% copper, 2.5% nickel plating

== Circulation figures ==
=== Victoria & Edward VII ===
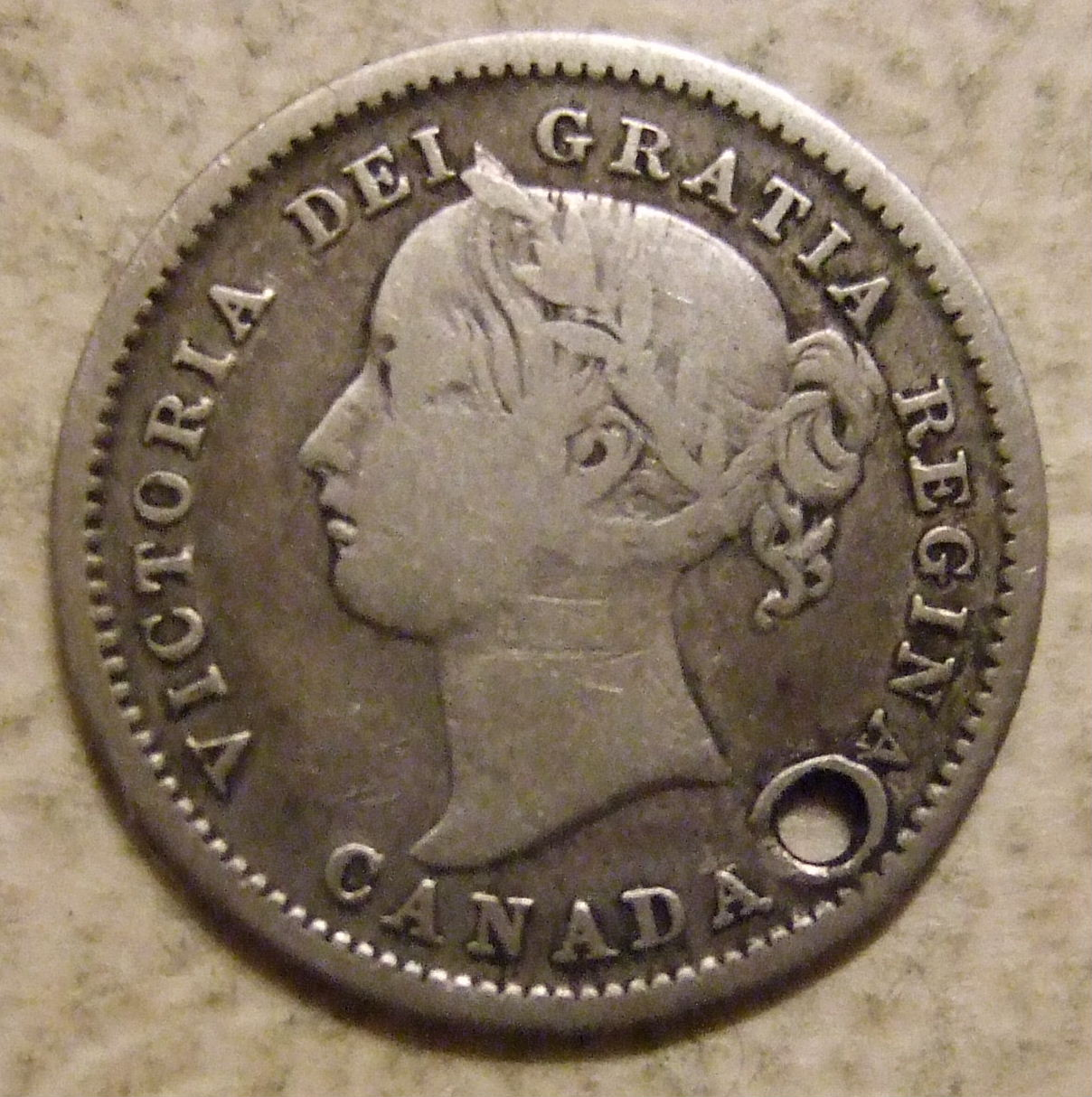
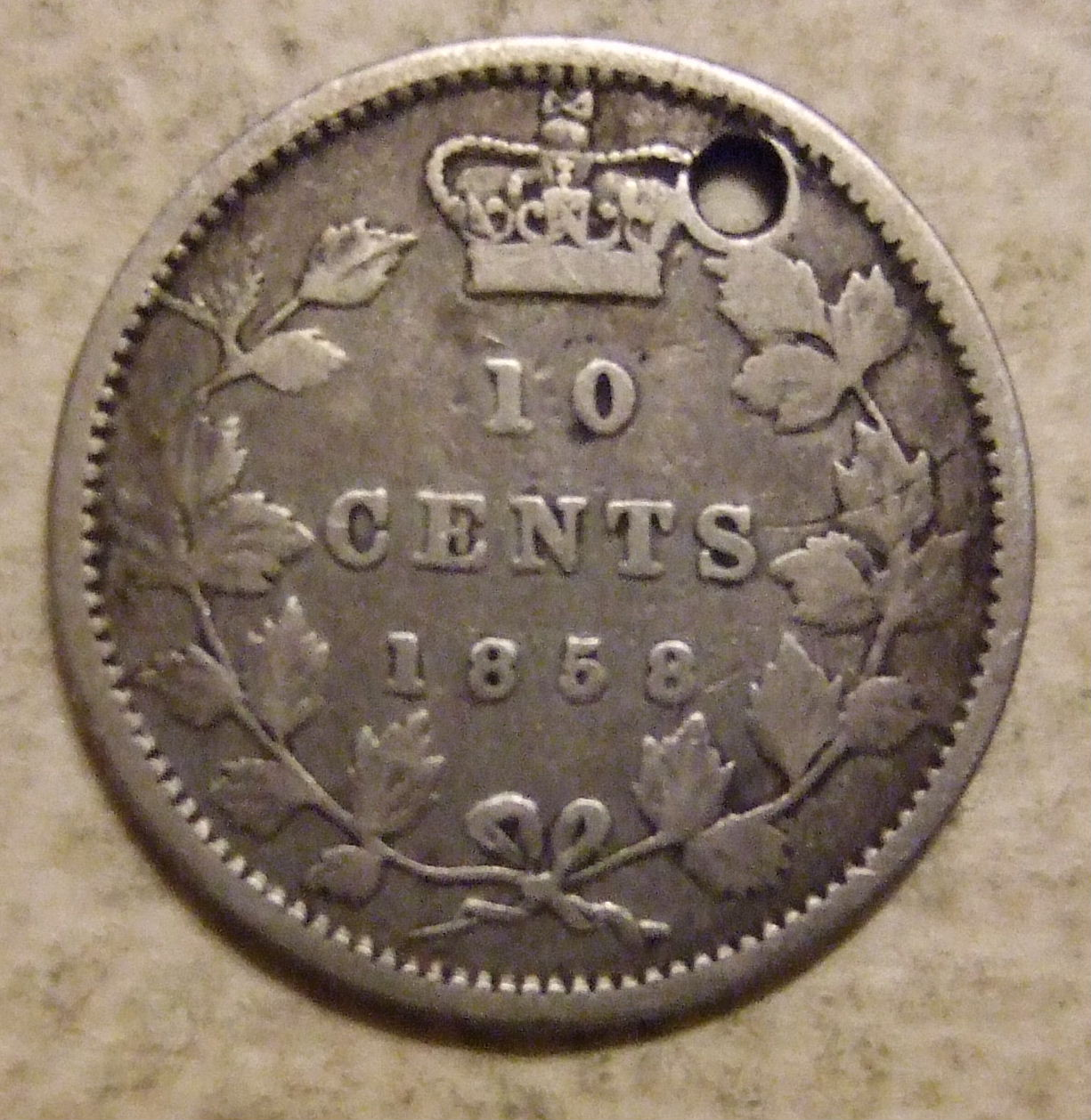
An 1858 dime featuring Queen Victoria

Year	Mintage	Notes
1858	1,250,000	
1870	1,600,000	This figure includes the "narrow" and scarcer "wide" 0 varieties.
1871	800,000	
1871 H (Note: The "H" on the coin refers to Ralph Heaton & Sons.)	1,870,000	
1872 H	1,000,000	
1874 H	600,000	
1875 H	1,000,000	
1880 H	1,500,000	
1881 H	950,000	
1882 H	1,000,000	
1883 H	300,000	
1884	150,000	
1885	400,000	
1886	800,000	This figure includes the "small" and "large" 6 varieties.
1887	350,000	
1888	500,000	
1889	600,000	Most of the reported mintage includes dimes dated 1888. An estimated 10,000 to 20,000 coins dated 1889 are thought to exist.
1890 H	450,000	
1891	800,000	Coins dated 1891 have either 21 or 22 leaves on their reverse.
1892	520,000	The "2" is punched over the "1" variety is scarce.
1893	500,000	This figure includes the "flat" and rare "round" top 3 varieties.
1894	500,000	
1896	650,000	
1898	720,000	
1899	1,200,000	This figure includes the "small" and "large" 9 varieties.
1900	1,100,000	
1901 Victoria	1,200,000	
1902 Edward VII	720,000	
1902 H	1,100,000	
1903	500,000	
1903 H	1,320,000	
1904	1,000,000	
1905	1,000,000	
1906	1,700,000	
1907	2,620,000	
1908	776,666	
1909 Victorian leaves	1,697,220	Leaves are similar to the 1902 to 1908 reverse.
1909 Edwardian leaves	1,697,220	Leaves are similar to the 1910 to 1912 reverse.
1910	4,468,331	

=== George V & George VI ===
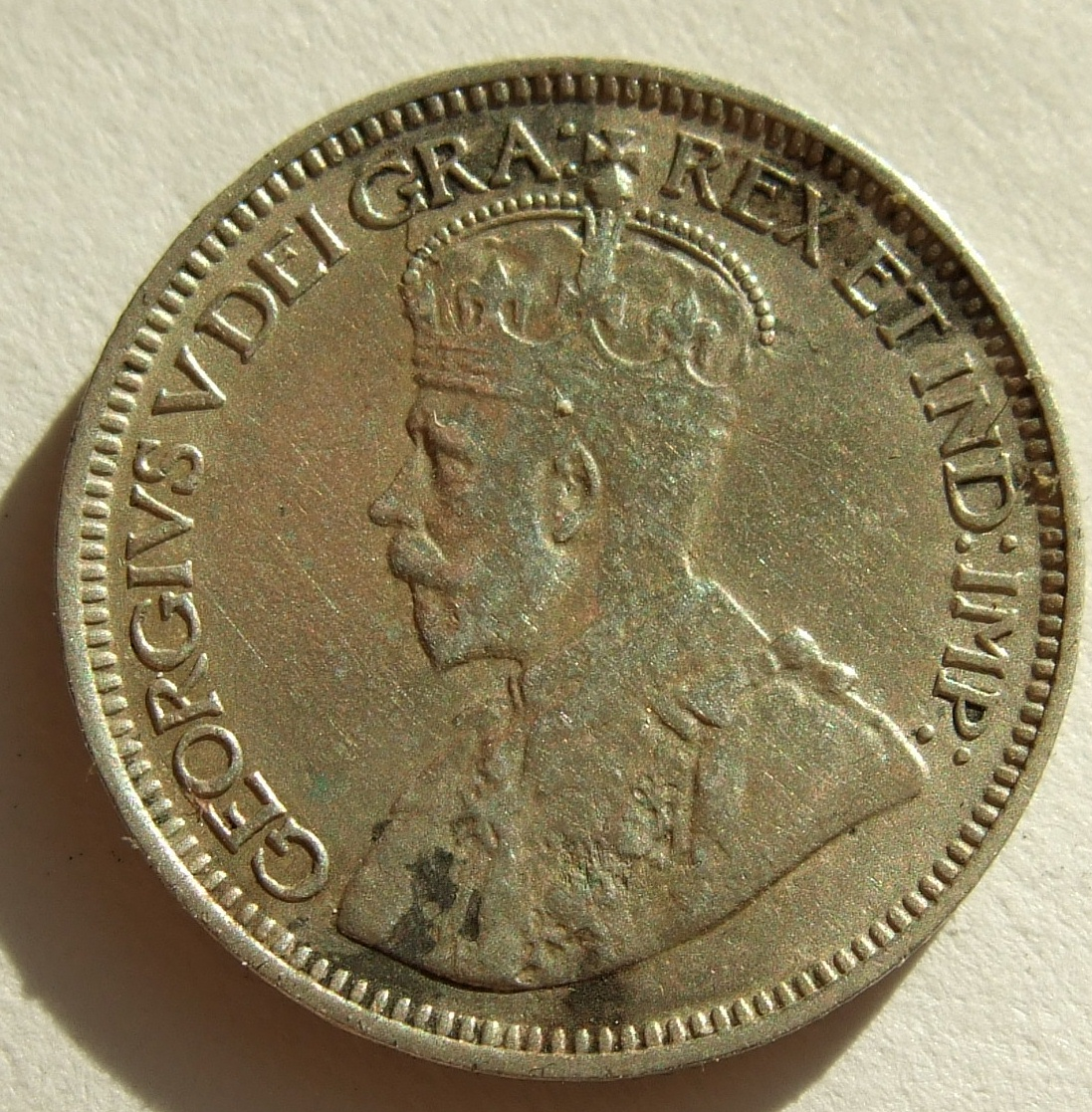
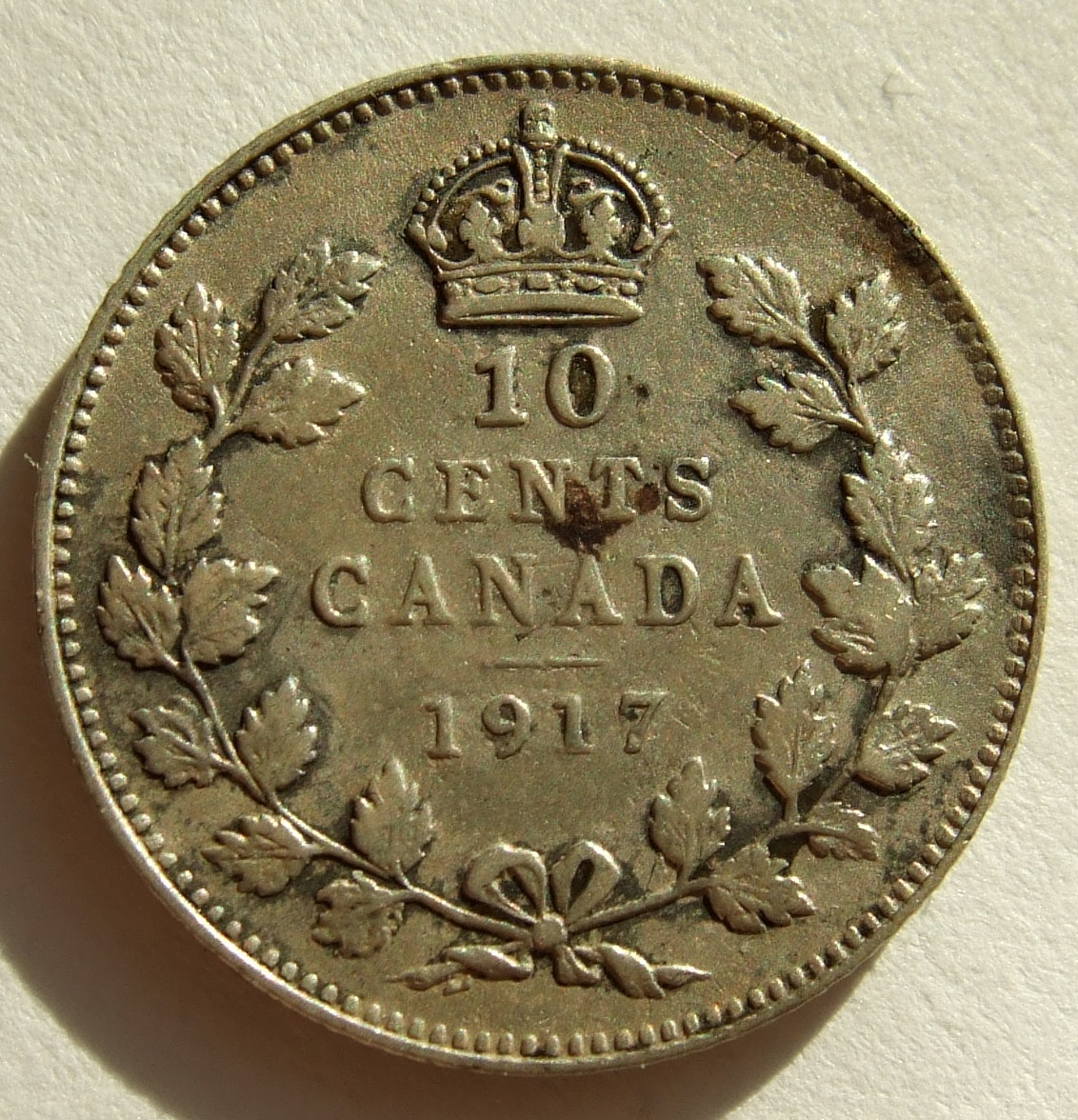
A 1917 dime featuring King George V
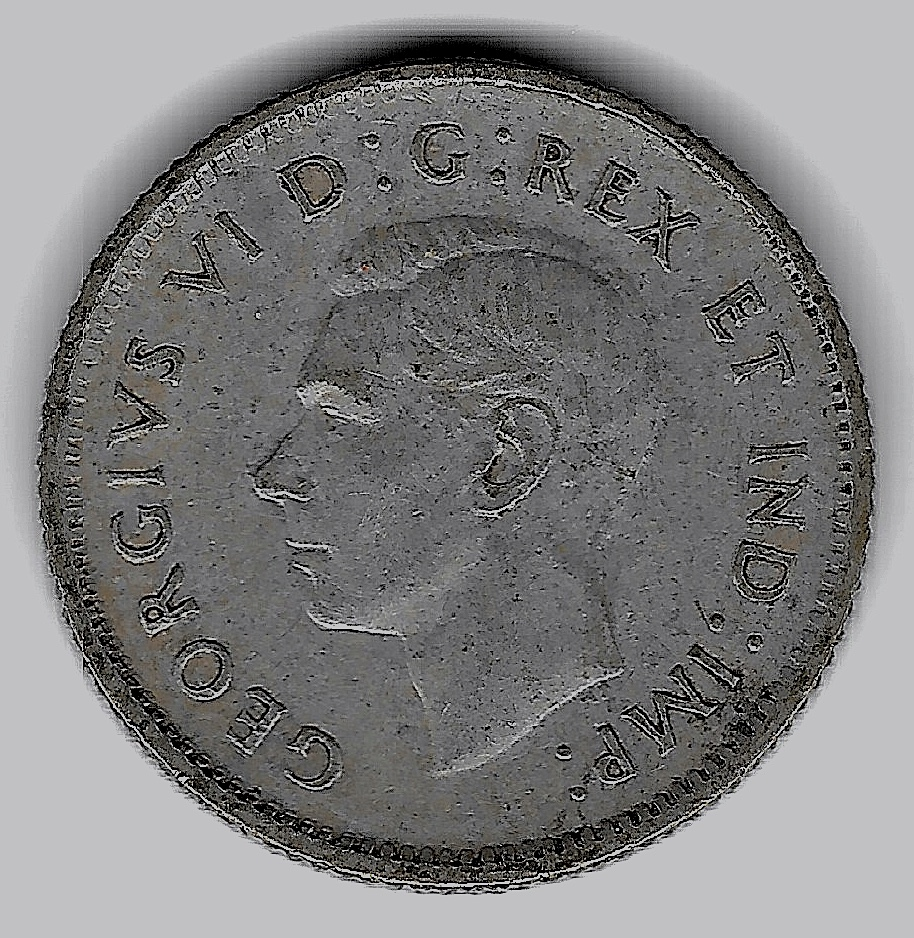
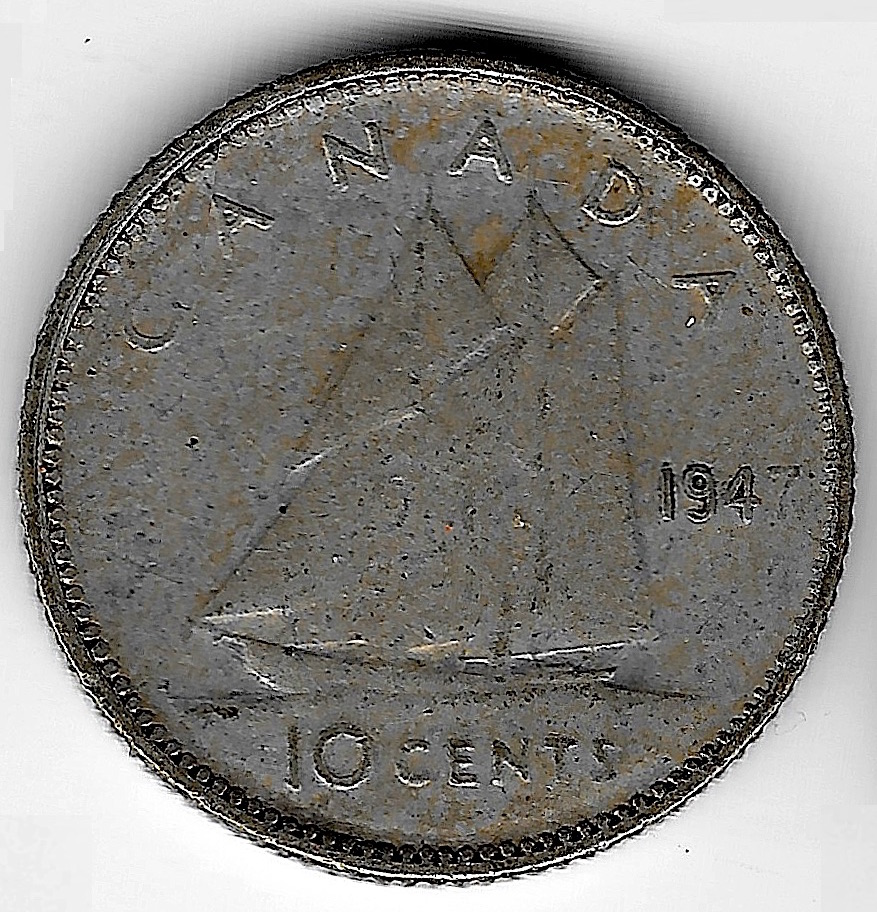
A 1947 dime featuring King George VI

Year	Mintage
1911 no "DEI GRA" (Note: The word "GRA" (Gratia) was removed from the obverse of the coin to make room for "IND:IMP" (Emperor of India). It was later restored in 1912 after public backlash.)	2,737,584
1912 with "DEI GRA"	3,235,557
1913 small leaves	3,613,937
1913 large leaves	3,613,937
1914	2,549,811
1915	688,057
1916	4,218,114
1917	5,011,988
1918	5,133,602
1919	7,877,722
1920	6,305,345
1921	2,469,562
1928	2,458,602
1929	3,253,888
1930	1,831,043
1931	2,067,421
1932	1,154,317
1933	672,368
1934	409,067
1935	384,056
1936 George V	2,460,871 (Note: The dot below date variety is extremely rare with just 5 specimens in existence.)
1937 George VI	2,500,095
1938	4,197,323
1939	5,501,748
1940	16,526,470
1941	8,716,386
1942	10,214,011
1943	21,143,229
1944	9,383,582
1945	10,979,570
1946	6,300,066
1947	4,431,926
1947 ML (Note: Obverse "IND: IMP:" aka Indiae Imperator (Emperor of India) removed.)	9,638,793
1948	422,741
1949	11,336,172
1950	17,823,075
1951 (Note: 1951 Canadian dimes have a "doubled die obverse" variety.)	15,079,265
1952	10,474,455

=== Elizabeth II ===
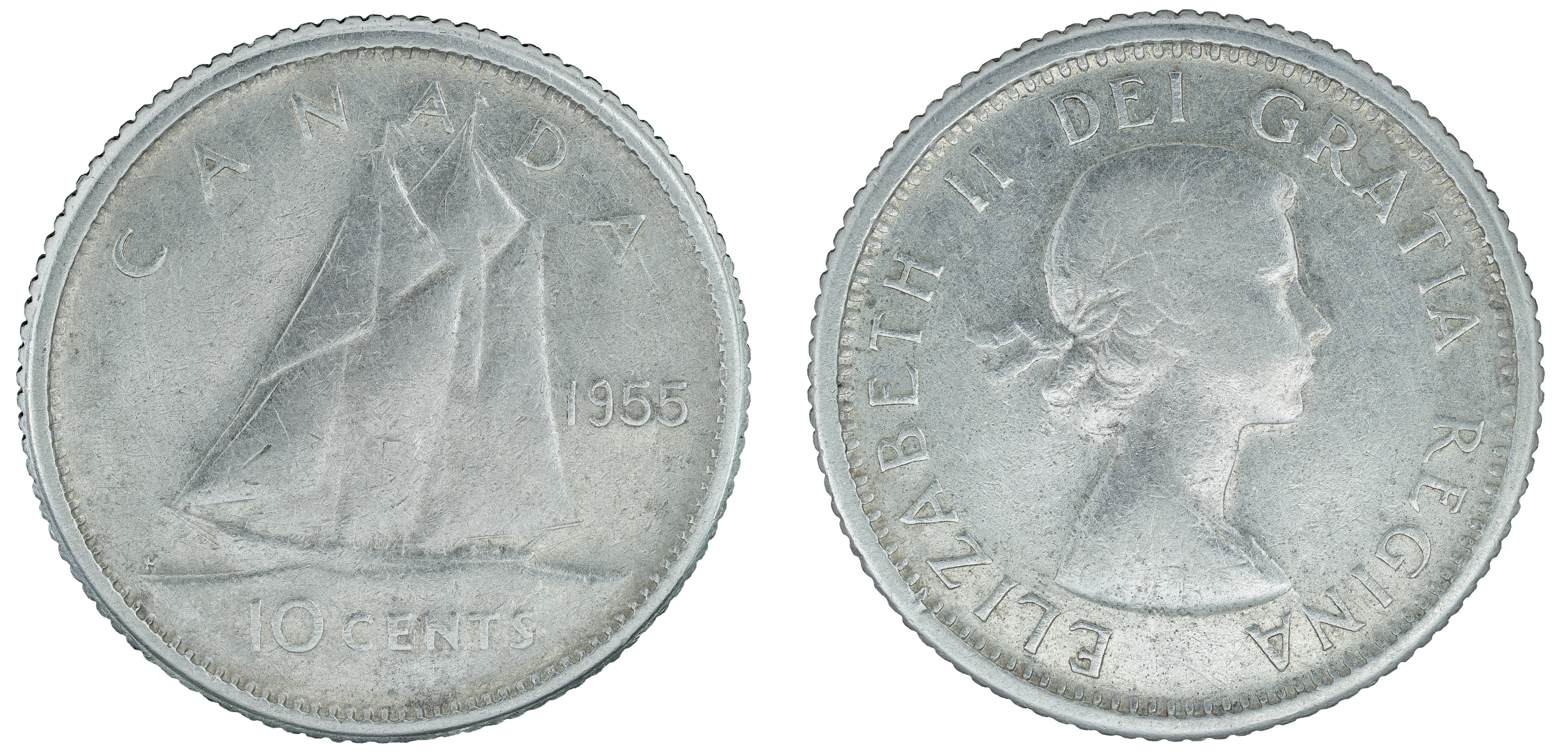
A 1955 dime featuring Queen Elizabeth II

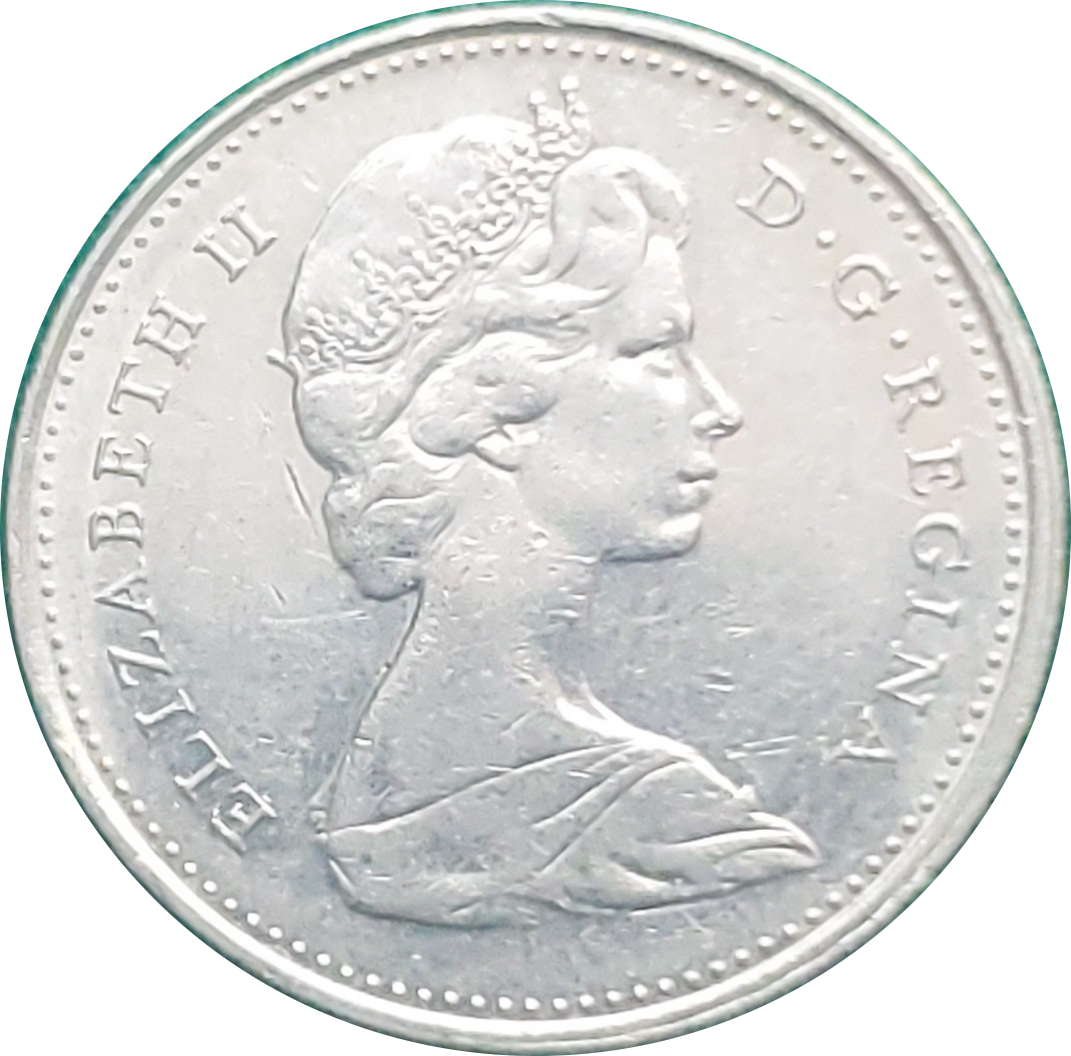
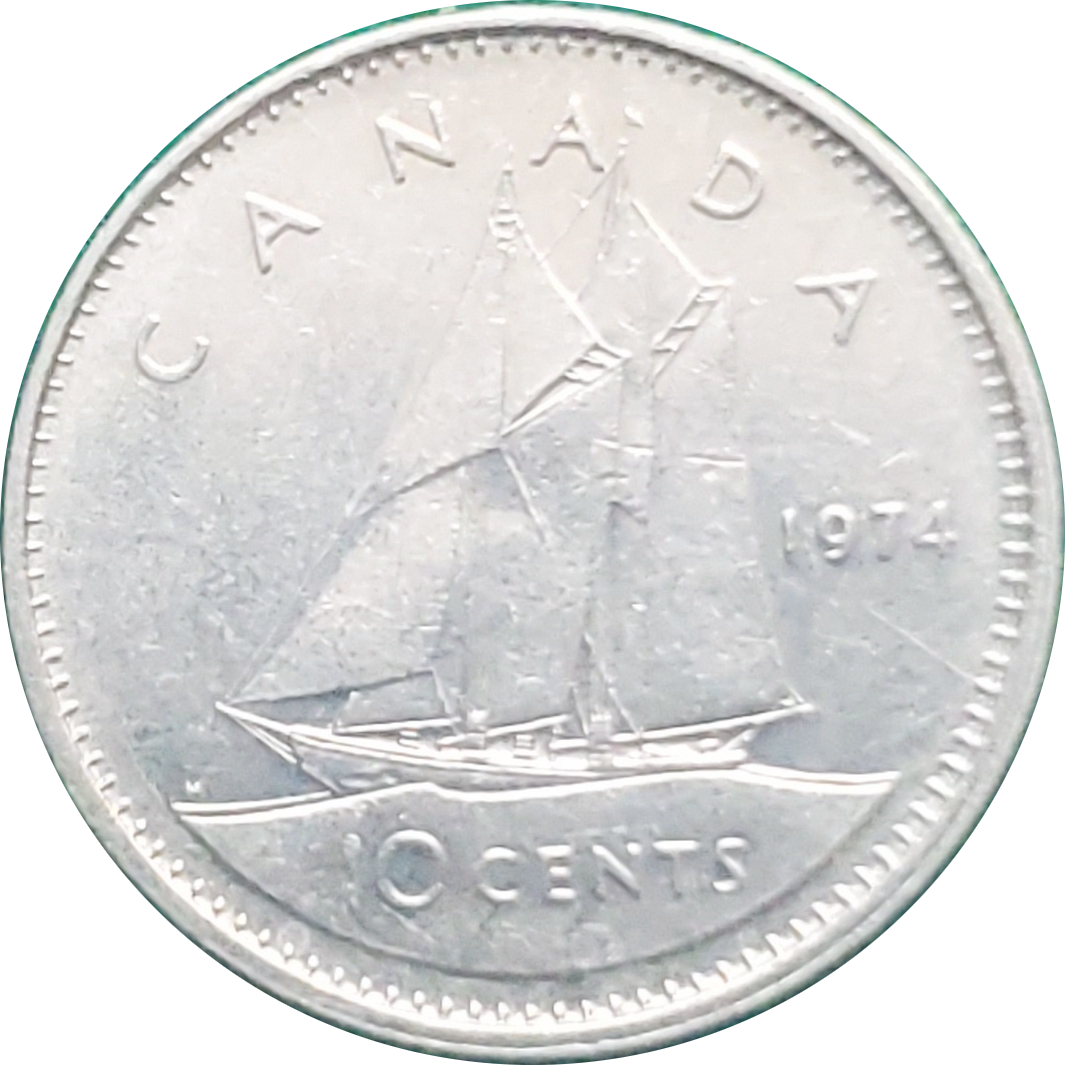
A 1974 dime featuring an older Queen Elizabeth II

Year	Mintage
1953 no strap	17,706,395
1953 strap	17,706,395
1954	4,493,150
1955	12,237,294
1956	16,732,844
1957	16,110,229
1958	10,621,236
1959	19,691,433
1960	45,446,835
1961	26,850,859
1962	41,864,335
1963	41,916,208
1964	49,518,549
1965	56,965,392
1966	34,567,898
1967 80% silver (Note: This dime features an Atlantic mackerel and is dated 1867–1967.)	62,998,215
1967 50% silver	62,998,215
1968 50% silver (Note: Ottawa reeding.)	70,460,000
1968 nickel	87,412,930
1968 nickel (Note: Philadelphia reeding.)	85,170,000
1969 (Note: The "large ship, large date" (1968 style) variety is very rare with 10 to 20 coins known. Coins dated 1969 have a redesigned Bluenose (schooner) which is smaller in size.)	55,833,929
1970	5,249,296
1971	41,016,968
1972	60,169,387
1973	167,715,435
1974	201,566,565
1975	207,680,000
1976	95,018,533
1977	128,452,206
1978	170,366,431
1979	237,321,321
1980	170,111,533
1981	123,912,900
1982	93,475,000
1983	111,065,000
1984	121,690,000
1985	143,025,000
1986	168,620,000
1987	147,309,000
1988	162,998,558
1989	199,104,414
1990	65,023,000
1991	50,397,000
1992	174,476,000
1993	135,569,000
1994	145,800,000
1995	123,875,000
1996	51,814,000
1997	43,126,000
1998	203,514,000
1999	258,462,000
2000	159,125,000
2001 P Bluenose	266,000,000
2001 P Year of the Volunteer (Note: Issued in honor of the United Nations' International Year of the Volunteer.)	224,714,000
2002 P	252,563,000
2003 P crowned	162,398,000
2003 P uncrowned	162,398,000
2004 P	211,924,000
2005 P	212,175,000
2006 P	312,122,000
2007	304,110,000
2008	467,495,000
2009	370,700,000
2010	252,500,000
2011	292,325,000
2012	334,675,000
2013	104,775,000
2014	153,450,000
2015	112,475,000
2016	220,000,000
2017	199,925,000
2017 150th anniversary of Confederation (Note: 150th anniversary of the Confederation of Canada. Features a maple leaf (titled "Wings of Peace") that forms the wings and tail of a dove. The theme of the coin is "Our Character". Dated 1867–2017.)	20,000,000
2018	118,525,000
2019	159,775,000
2020	68,750,000
2021 Bluenose (old)	170,775,000
2021 dual dated (Note: These dimes are dated 1921–2021 to honour the centennial of the Bluenose.)	170,775,000
2022	103,400,000

=== Charles III ===
Year	Mintage
2023	43,205,000
2024	77,275,000
2025	TBA

== Commemoratives ==
Date	Mintage	Reason
1997	49,848	500th anniversary of Caboto's first transatlantic voyage
1998	43,269	90th anniversary of the Royal Canadian Mint
2000	69,791	100th anniversary of the first credit union in Canada
2001	40,634	International Year of the Volunteer (non-circulating silver proof)
2002	65,315	Elizabeth II (Golden Jubilee; non-circulating silver proof)
2003	21,537	Elizabeth II (Golden Jubilee)
2004	39,486	100th anniversary of the Open Golf Championship of Canada
2010	4,996	75th anniversary of Canada's Voyageur Silver Dollar
2011	6,000	100th anniversary of George V on Canadian coins
2017	8,017	150th anniversary of the Confederation of Canada (Centennial mackerel; 2017 version)
2017	20,000	150th anniversary of the Confederation of Canada (our home and native land)
2021	6,000,000	In 2021, a new Bluenose design was issued on the reverse; these dimes feature coloured blue waves.
2021	9,000,000	Uncoloured version of the new Bluenose design
2023	952,000	Elizabeth II (Platinum Jubilee)

== Collecting ==
- 1936 dot: Extremely rare with only 5 known. There are 3 in private collections, one graded Specimen-63 and 2 examples graded SP-68. The other 2 are in the Ottawa currency museum. The most recent of these to sell at auction was one of the SP68 coins, which brought US$184,000 in a Heritage Auction in January 2010.
- 1969 large date: Fewer than 20 examples of the large date variety exist. High-grade versions of this coin sell for $15,000 to $30,000. There is only one graded in mint state as of 2012.
- 1999p: The first Canadian 10-cent coin issued with the new plating "P" process. Plated coins are marked with a small "P" beneath the Queen's effigy on the obverse of the coin. Mintage is limited to 20,000 coins.
- 2000p: The 2000p Canada dime is scarce with fewer than 250 examples minted. The 2000p dime was lent to the vending industry by the Royal Canadian Mint to test the compatibility of the new plating process of circulation coins with existing vending machines and parking meters. Under contractual obligation, these coins were to be returned to the mint once the compatibility tests were complete. Of the approximately 250 coins minted, many were not returned to the mint, leading to significant debate surrounding the legality of owning these coins. High-grade examples of the 2000p 10-cent issue range from $1,500 to $3,000 CDN. Unlike the 5-cent 2000p issues, the 10-cent coin was not officially released by the mint, and entered the numismatic market illegally.
