= Canadian fifty-cent coin =

Canadian coin

Fifty cents
- Canada
- Value: 0.50 Canadian dollar
- Mass: 6.9 g
- Diameter: 27.13 mm
- Thickness: 1.95 mm
- Edge: Milled
- Composition: Nickel-plated steel 93.15% steel, 4.75% Cu, 2.1% Ni plating
- Years of minting: 1870–present

Obverse
- Design: Charles III, King of Canada
- Designer: Steven Rosati
- Design date: 2023

Reverse
- Design: Canadian coat of arms
- Designer: Cathy Bursey-Sabourin
- Design date: 1997

In Canada, the fifty-cent piece (French: pièce de cinquante cents canadienne) is a circulation coin issued by the Royal Canadian Mint worth 50 cents, equal to 1/2 of a Canadian dollar. It features the Canadian coat of arms on the reverse and the effigy of the current reigning monarch on the obverse.

Though it is regularly minted, it is not made in large quantities (approximate annual average production of 150,000) and, since 2004, has only been available to the public directly from the mint.

The denomination has seen limited public use since the mid-20th century due to low demand, yet it remains part of Canada's official currency system and appears in annual mint sets and commemorative releases.

The mint's website lists the 2007 50-cent coin as "rarely seen yet replete with tradition".

== History ==
At the opening ceremonies for the Ottawa branch of the Royal Mint on January 2, 1908, Governor General Earl Grey struck Canada's first domestically produced coin: a silver 50-cent coin bearing the effigy of King Edward VII.

The 50-cent coin bears the coat of arms given to Canada by King George V in 1921. The inscriptions included on the coin are:

- A Mari usque ad Mare, 'From sea to sea'
- Desiderantes Meliorem Patrium, 'They desire a better country'

Demand for 50-cent coins was low during the early to mid-1920s, and only 28,000 coins were issued between 1921 and 1929. When demand increased briefly in 1929, the master of the Ottawa Mint ordered the melting of the remaining 1920 and 1921 coins, totalling 480,392 pieces. The decision was based on concerns that releasing a large number of coins dated 1920 and 1921 might lead the public to suspect counterfeits. Approximately 75 examples of the 1921 issue are believed to survive, mostly from specimen sets sold at the time.

Although the denomination is rarely used in everyday transactions, it remains popular among coin collectors and within numismatic communities.

In 2002, the Royal Canadian Mint made an unsuccessful attempt to promote circulation of the coin by issuing a special edition marking the 50th anniversary of the accession of Elizabeth II. After this failed promotion, the mint ceased distributing 50-cent coins to banks. They are now available only in rolls or in numismatic sets sold directly by the mint, typically at twice their face value, for example $25 per roll of 25 coins.

The royal effigy of King Charles III, introduced in 2023, was designed by Canadian artist Steven Rosati.

== Composition and size ==
Years	Mass	Diameter	Thickness	Composition
1870–1919	11.62 g	29.72 mm	n/a	92.5% silver, 7.5% copper
1920–1967	11.66 g	29.72 mm	n/a	80% silver, 20% copper
1968–2000	8.10 g	27.13 mm	1.93 mm	99.9% nickel
2001–present	6.90 g	27.13 mm	1.95 mm	93.15% steel, 4.75% copper, 2.1% nickel plating

== Circulation figures ==
=== Victoria and Edward VII ===
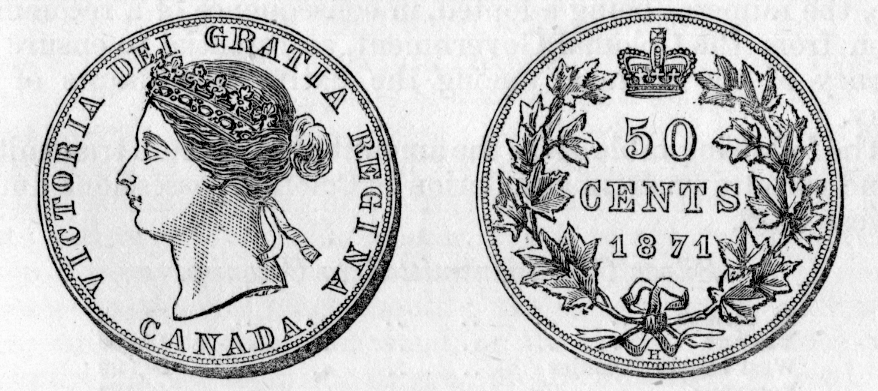
1871 Canadian 50-cent coin

Year	Mintage	Notes
1870	450,000	
1870 LCW (Note: The "LCW" refers to the initials of the designer who made Victoria's bust (obverse side).)	450,000	
1871	200,000	
1871 H (Note: The "H" on the coin refers to "Ralph Heaton & Sons".)	45,000	
1872 H	80,000	This figure includes the inverted "A" for "V" in Victoria variety.
1881 H	150,000	
1888	60,000	
1890 H	20,000	
1892	151,000	
1894	29,036	
1898	100,000	
1899	50,000	
1900	118,000	
1901 Victoria	80,000	
1902 Edward VII	120,000	
1903 H	140,000	
1904	60,000	
1905	40,000	
1906	350,000	
1907	300,000	
1908	128,119	
1909	302,118	
1910 Victorian leaves	649,521	The leaves on the reverse were slightly modified.
1910 Edwardian leaves	649,521	The leaves on the reverse were slightly modified.

=== George V and George VI ===
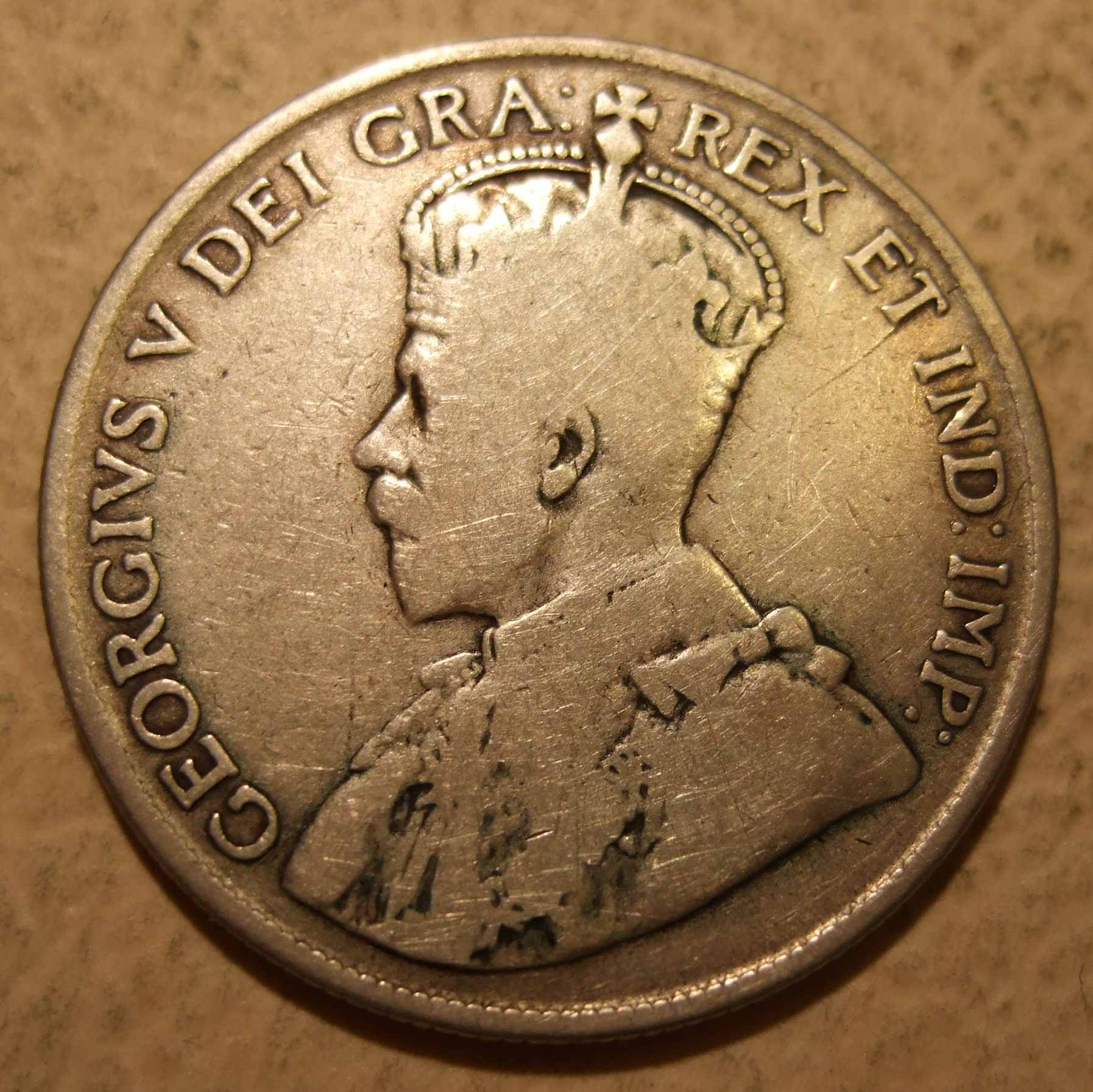
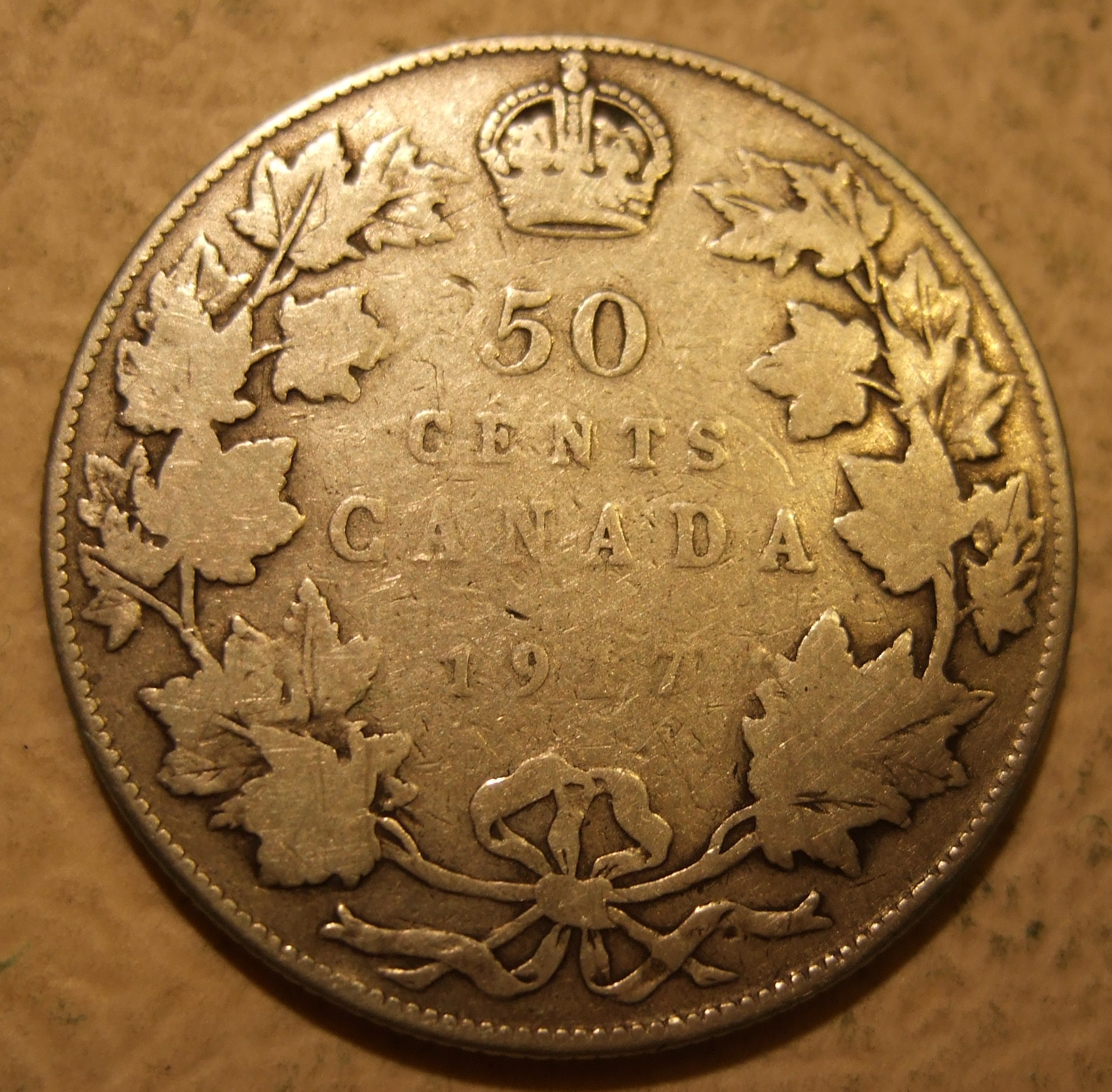
A 1917 50-cent piece featuring King George V
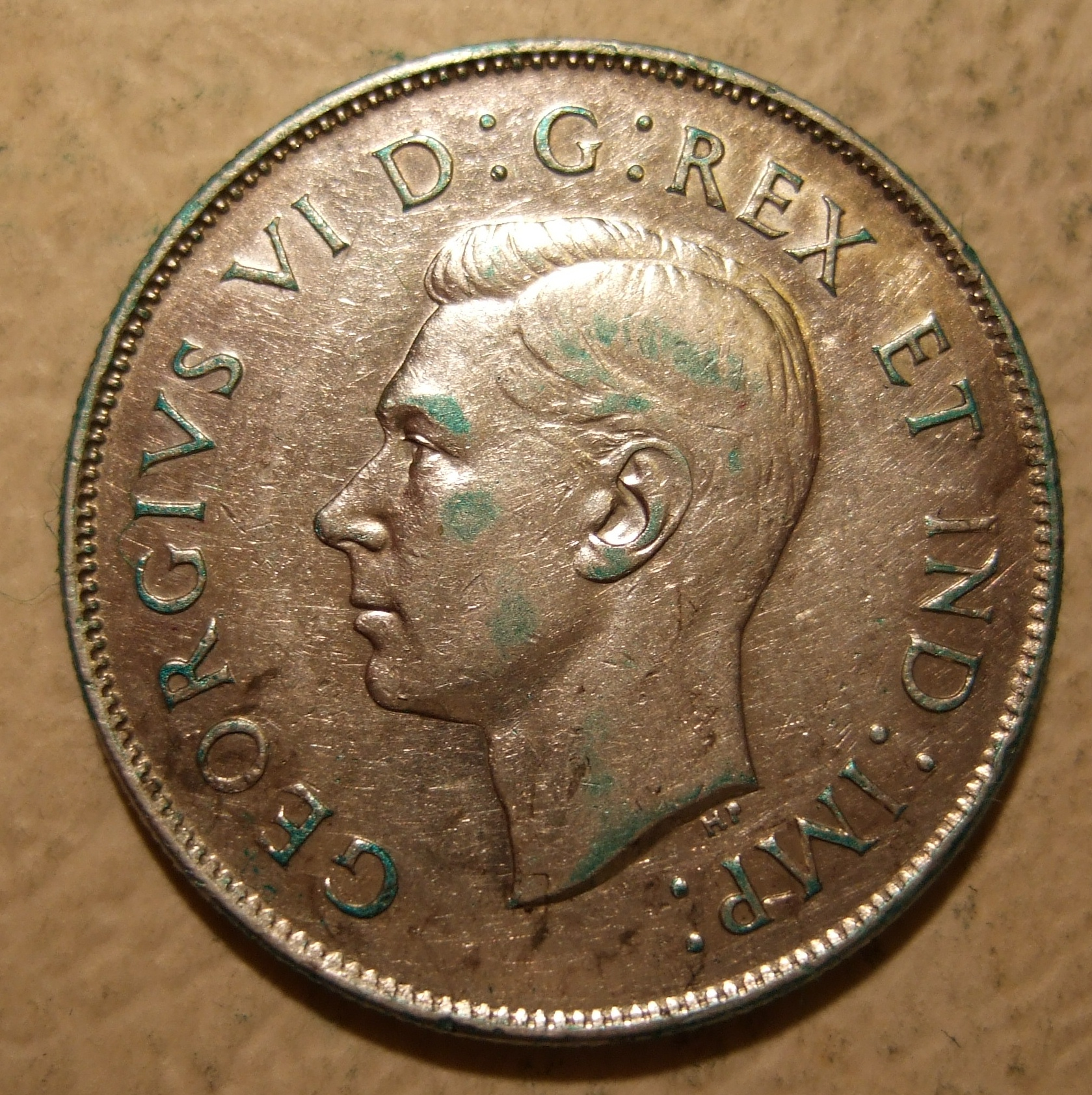
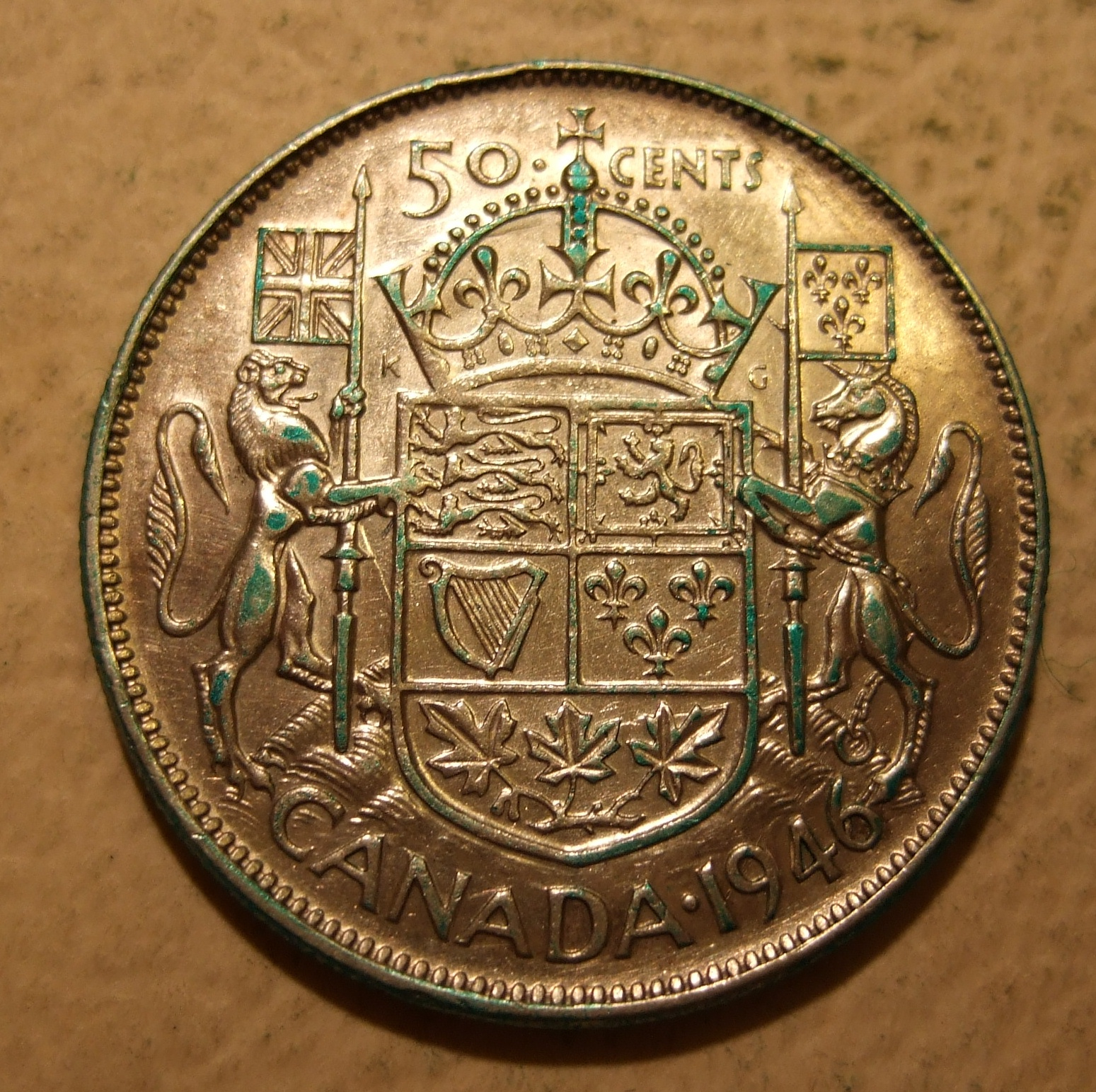
A 1946 50-cent coin featuring King George VI

Year	Mintage	Notes
1911 no "Dei gra"	209,972	The words Dei gra (Latin for 'by the grace of God') were removed from the obverse of the coin to make room for Ind:Imp (Latin for 'Emperor of India').
1912 with "Dei gra"	285,867	"Dei gra" was later restored in 1912 after public backlash for "godless" coins.
1913	265,889	
1914	160,128	
1916	459,070	
1917	752,213	
1918	754,989	
1919	1,113,429	
1920	584,691	
1921	Unknown	Only 75 to 100 coins are known to exist.
1929	228,328	
1931	57,581	
1932	19,213	As coin collecting was becoming widely popular, many of these coins were saved.
1934	39,539	
1936	38,550	
1937	192,016	
1938	192,018	
1939	287,976	
1940	1,996,566	
1941	1,714,874	
1942	1,974,164	
1943	3,109,583	
1944	2,460,205	
1945	1,959,528	
1946	950,235	This figure includes the "hoof in 6" variety.
1947	424,885 (Note: This figure includes the "straight" and "curved" 7 varieties.)	
1947 ML	38,433	Obverse Ind:Imp (Latin for 'Emperor of India') removed
1948	37,784	
1949	858,991	This figure includes the "hoof over 9" variety.
1950	2,384,179	This figure includes the "lines" and "no lines" in 0 varieties.
1951	2,421,730	
1952	2,596,465	

=== Elizabeth II ===
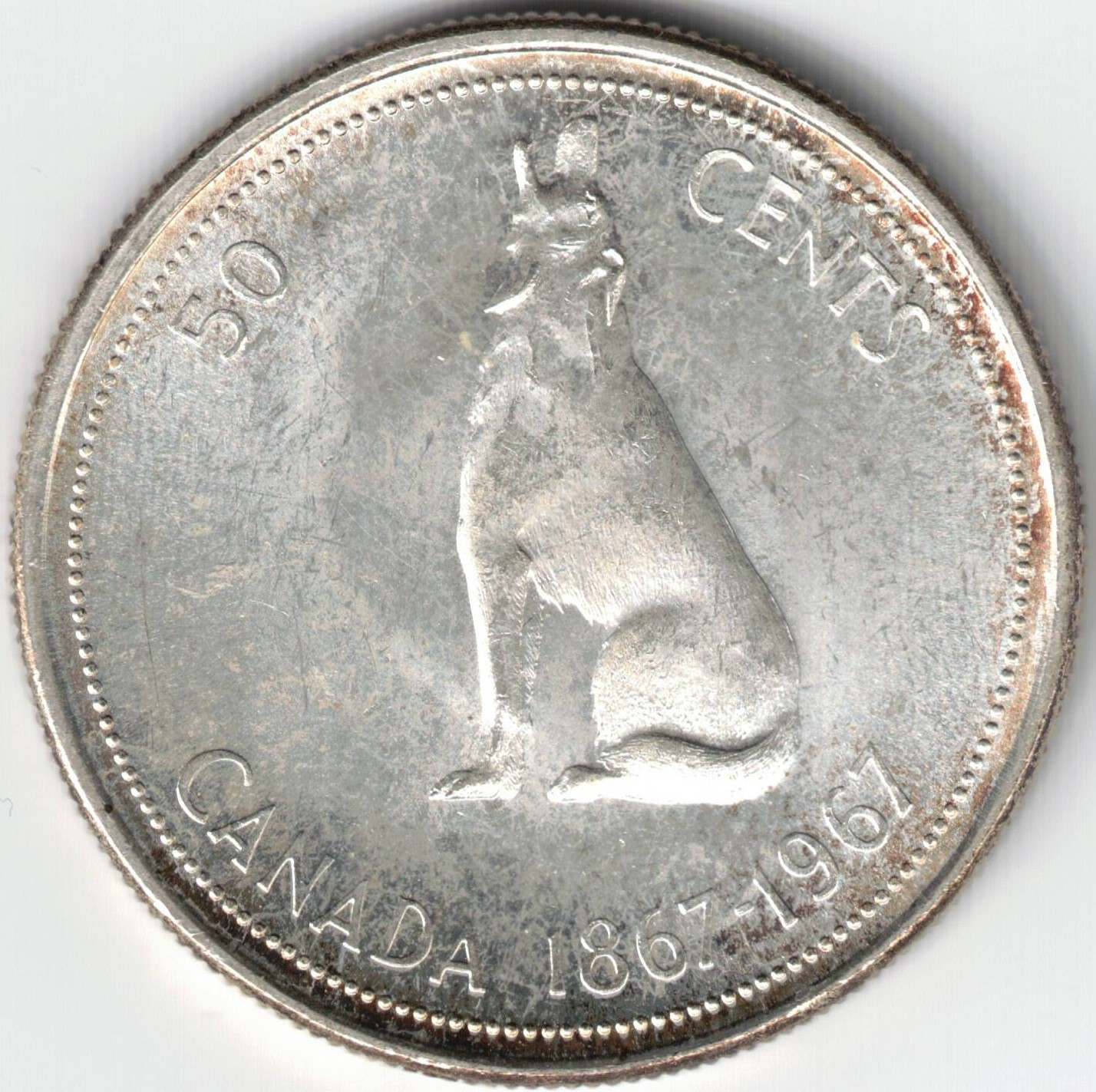
1967 Canadian Centennial 50-cent coin (reverse side)

Year	Mintage	Notes
1953 no strap	1,630,429	This variety is also called with/without shoulder fold.
1953 strap	1,630,429	This variety is also called with/without shoulder fold.
1954	506,305	
1955	753,511	
1956	1,379,499	
1957	2,171,689	
1958	2,957,266	Large reverse design, simple Canadian coat of arms
1959	3,095,535	Small reverse design, complete coat of arms
1960	3,488,897	
1961	3,584,417	
1962	5,208,030	
1963	8,348,871	
1964	9,377,676	1st obverse portrait
1965	12,629,974	2nd obverse portrait
1966	7,920,496	Last regular issue coin in silver
1967	4,211,392	Canadian Centennial; this coin features a howling wolf and is dated 1867–1967.
1968	3,966,932	
1969	7,113,929	
1970	2,429,526	
1971	2,166,444	
1972	2,515,632	
1973	2,546,096	
1974	3,436,650	
1975	3,710,000	
1976	2,940,719	
1977	709,839	
1978	3,341,892	This figure includes the "square" and "round" jewels varieties.
1979	3,425,000	
1980	1,574,000	
1981	2,690,272	
1982	2,236,674	This figure includes the "small" and "large" beads varieties.
1983	1,177,000	
1984	1,502,989	
1985	2,188,374	
1986	781,400	
1987	373,000	From this date forward, 50¢ coins were generally minted in smaller amounts.
1988	220,000	
1989	266,419	2nd obverse portrait
1990	207,000	3rd obverse portrait
1991	490,000	
1992	445,000	125th anniversary of Confederation; this coin is dated 1867–1992.
1993	393,000	
1994	987,000	
1995	626,000	
1996	458,000	
1997	387,000	Revised Canadian coat of arms on the reverse
1998	308,000	
1999	496,000	
2000	559,000	Struck in nickel
2001 P (Note: Struck in nickel-plated steel)	389,000	
2002 P (GJ)	14,440,000	(1952–2002) Elizabeth II Golden Jubilee
2003 P	—	50¢ coins minted since 2003 are not for circulation.
2004	0	
2005	200,000	
2006	98,000	
2007	250,000	
2008	211,000	
2009	150,000	
2010	150,000	
2011	175,000	
2012	250,000	
2013	375,000	
2014	500,000	
2015	625,000	
2016	800,000	
2017	875,000	Includes sesquicentennial commemorative coin
2018	750,000	
2019	750,000	
2020	750,000	
2021	375,000	
2022	375,000	
2023	Undetermined	

=== Charles III ===
Year	Mintage	Notes
2023	Undetermined	First year of issue with the effigy of King Charles III on the obverse
2024	Specimen 30,000; Proof 20,000	Available through mint rolls and sets
2025	Specimen 30,000	Available through mint rolls and sets
2026	Undetermined	Available through mint rolls and sets

== Commemoratives ==
Date	Mintage	Artist	Reason
1998	43,269	William Henry James Blakemore	90th anniversary of the Royal Canadian Mint
1998	14,000	F. G. Peter	110th anniversary of speed and figure skating
1998	14,000	F. G. Peter	100th anniversary of ski racing
1998	56,428	Friedrich Peter	110 years of Canadian soccer
1998	56,428	Friedrich Peter	20 years of Canadian auto racing
1999	52,115	D. H. Curley	95th anniversary of the 1904 Open Golf Championship
1999	52,115	D. H. Curley	125th anniversary of the first Canadian vs US Yacht Race
1999	52,115	D. H. Curley	100th anniversary of the first competition for the Grey Cup
1999	52,115	D. H. Curley	60th anniversary of the invention of basketball
2000	50,091	Brian Hughes	125th anniversary of the first recorded modern hockey game
2000	50,091	Brian Hughes	240th anniversary of the introduction of curling to North America
2000	50,091	Brian Hughes	160th anniversary of the first steeplechase held in North America
2000	50,091	Brian Hughes	Birth of the first 5-pin bowling league
2002	65,315	Thomas Shingles	Elizabeth II (Golden Jubilee; non-circulating silver proof)
2003	21,537	Mary Gillick	Elizabeth II (Golden Jubilee)
2005	20,000	Peter Mossman	60th anniversary of the end of World War II – Battle of Britain
2005	20,000	Peter Mossman	60th anniversary of the end of World War II – Battle of Scheldt
2005	20,000	Peter Mossman	60th anniversary of the end of World War II – Battle of Sicily
2005	20,000	Peter Mossman	60th anniversary of the end of World War II – Battle of the Atlantic
2005	20,000	Peter Mossman	60th anniversary of the end of World War II – Liberation of the Netherlands
2005	20,000	Peter Mossman	60th anniversary of the end of World War II – Raid of Dieppe
2008	3,248	William Henry James Blakemore	100th anniversary of Royal Canadian Mint
2008	25,004	Various (Note: These coins came in a set of 6 (25,004 minted each) all celebrating the same theme.)	100th anniversary of the Montreal Canadiens
2011	6,000	William Henry James Blakemore	100th anniversary of George V on Canadian coins
2012	30,900	Christie Paquet	Elizabeth II (Diamond Jubilee)
2012	14,997	Yves Bérubé	100th anniversary of Titanic
2012	5,988	Christie Paquet	150th anniversary of the Cariboo Gold Rush
2013	24,967	DC Comics	75th anniversary of Superman
2014	15,000	Yves Bérubé	100th anniversary of the sinking of the Empress of Ireland
2014	4,746	Matthew Bowen	150th anniversary of the Charlottetown and Québec Conferences
2015	5,102	Pierre Leduc	50th anniversary of the Canadian flag
2017	8,017	—N/a	150th anniversary of the Confederation of Canada (Centennial Wolf; 2017 version)
2017	20,000	Ariana Cuvin	150th anniversary of the Confederation of Canada (Canada 150 logo; silver proof)
2017	4,000	—N/a	100th anniversary of the 50-cent coin
2018	4,000	—N/a	75th anniversary of George VI on the 1943 50-cent coin
2018	Unknown	Steve McPhee	200th anniversary of the 49th Parallel
2019	2,500	Thomas Shingles	60th anniversary of the 50-cent coin (1959–2019)
2021	250,000	George Kruger Gray	100th anniversary of the Canadian Coat of Arms
2023	20,000	Cathy Bursey-Sabourin	Elizabeth II (Platinum Jubilee; silver proof)
2024	7,500	Cathy Bursey-Sabourin	Elizabeth II (Platinum Jubilee)

== Collecting ==
Known as the "king of Canadian coins", the 1921 Canadian 50-cent coin is rare, with a high-grade example (PCGS MS-66) having sold for US$227,546 in a January 2010 Heritage Auction. The highest-graded specimen is graded by PCGS at MS-67 and was last sold (by Diverse Equities) in the year 2000 to a private collector for the US$400,000.
