= Bell Let's Talk =

Campaign by Bell Canada

Bell Let's Talk Bell Cause pour la cause
- The Logo of the Bell Let's Talk Program
- Genre: Hashtag Activism
- Frequency: Annual
- Location: Canada
- Inaugurated: January 2011; 15 years ago
- Most recent: January 21, 2026
- Organizer: Bell Canada
- Website: letstalk.bell.ca

Bell Let's Talk (Canadian French: Bell Cause pour la cause) is a campaign created by the Canadian telecommunications company, Bell Canada, in an effort to raise awareness and combat stigma surrounding mental illness in Canada. It is the largest corporate commitment to mental health in Canada. Originally a five-year, $50 million program to create a stigma-free Canada and drive action in mental health care, research, and the workplace, Bell Let's Talk was renewed in 2015 for five years with a target of committing $100 million, and in 2020, the initiative was renewed for a further five years, and a commitment of $155 million. The most prominent part of the initiative is "Bell Let's Talk Day," an annual one-day advertising campaign held on the fourth or last Wednesday of January where money is donated to mental health funds based on the number of social media and communication interactions that include the branded hashtag, #BellLetsTalk, or its Canadian French equivalent, #BellCause.

Since its founding in 2010, the campaign has committed over $121 million to mental health in Canada with over 1.3 billion interactions registered across various forms of media. #BellLetsTalk became the top trending topic on Twitter in 2015, and in 2018, it was the most used Canadian hashtag [of 2018] on Twitter. Although the program has received praise for being the first corporate campaign to acknowledge the stigma surrounding mental health, it has also been the subject of controversy for the alleged "corporatization of mental health".

== History ==
The Bell Let's Talk initiative began with a five-year goal of contributing $50 million to mental health programs around Canada. The campaign was started with a $1 million donation to the Royal Ottawa Hospital's Telemedicine program. Then-CEO George Cope desired a corporate social responsibility program for the company to compete with rival company, Telus, as they had recently taken up the cause of breast cancer.

Mary Deacon was brought on as chair of the new program. She previously served for ten years as the president of the Centre for Addiction and Mental Health in Toronto where she searched for brand partners to support their mental health initiatives. Cope, Bell's president, met Deacon at a volunteer event for the Centre and offered her the job. She accepted, stating that she "would not have come to Bell if [she] did not believe absolutely that there was a genuine, authentic commitment to make a difference." According to Deacon, mental health was chosen to differentiate Bell in the marketplace.

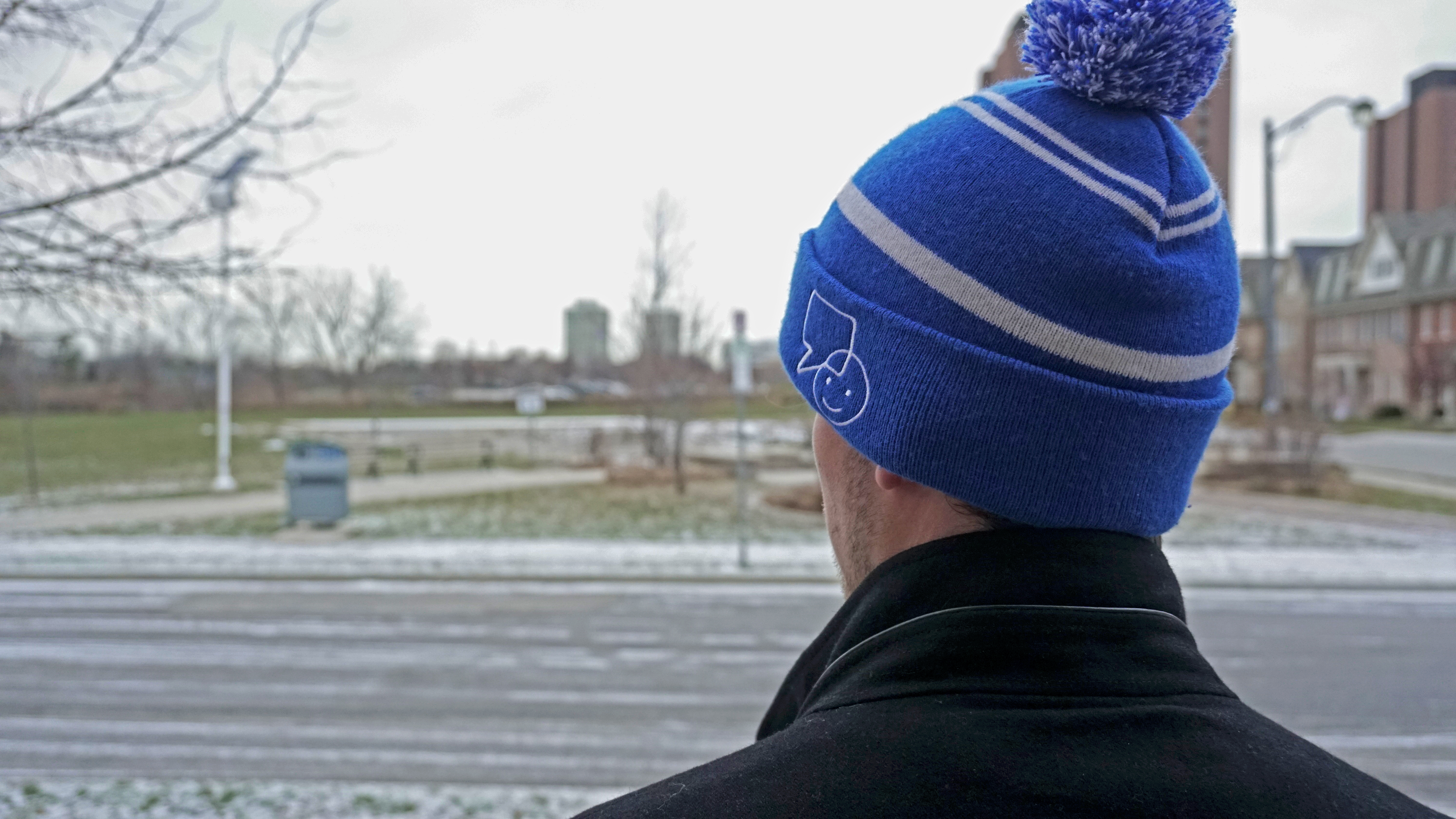
Branded promotional materials such as this hat are given out at events.

The program was designed with a marketing motive in mind; the topic of mental health was chosen largely because it was uncharted territory in the corporate sponsorship area and was sure to be influential. There was much deliberation towards the name, and over whether or not "Bell" should be included in the brand. In the end, the name was included to convey that the company was willing to de-stigmatize mental health by standing beside the issue. The name "Bell Let's Talk" was chosen both as a reference to the campaign's goals of encouraging participants to speak up about mental health issues, as well as a play on the company's role in the telecommunications industry.

Since the beginning of the annual Bell Let's Talk Day in 2011, Bell has recorded over a billion total interactions. Regarding #BellLetsTalk's progress, Mary Deacon noted that, "It's been an incredible outpouring of support for those who struggle with mental illness over the last 8 years, and we're now ready to break a billion total messages."

== Methods ==
Through the use of various outlets, the campaign aims to support mental health issues through four main sectors: anti-stigma, care and access, research, and workplace leadership.

=== Social media ===
Bell's initiative is designed to spread the awareness of mental health issues through conversation and social media, primarily through the use of its hashtag. For every "interaction" on Bell Let's Talk Day, the company pledges to donate five cents towards Canadian mental health, which is then divided among various community projects and major institutions across Canada.

The interactions counted towards the 2022 campaign include (five Canadian cents donated for each):
Media Platform	Interactions
Twitter and TikTok	Every use of the hashtag in a tweet or TikTok video, or view of the video posted on Bell's account counts as one interaction.
Facebook	Every use of the photo frame and view of the video.
Instagram LinkedIn and YouTube	Every view of the video.
Snapchat	Every use of the Bell Let's Talk lens and view of the video.
Talk	Every call made by Bell wireless or home phone customers counts as one interaction.
Text	Every text message sent over a Bell network.

=== Community Fund Grants ===
In February 2011, Bell announced the establishment of the Bell Let's Talk Community Fund, a fund established to provide "community grants" ranging from $5,000 to $25,000, to registered mental health organizations throughout Canada. The Community Fund excludes additional projects related to anti-stigma, events, research, and those involving neurological disorders such as autism. Since its inception, the Community Fund has provided 888 grants, accumulating to over $15 million in donations. The program also donates "major gifts" consisting of larger sums to high-profile institutions- often in partnership with governments and other charity organizations.

=== Celebrity support ===
Since the formation of the program, six-time cycling Olympian Clara Hughes has been the main spokesperson for the Bell Let's Talk initiative. Famous for being the only Canadian dual-season athlete to win multiple medals, Hughes herself has had depression throughout her life, and has taken part in many outreach events to support mental health awareness. Aside from taking part in regular tours to promote the Bell Let's Talk program, Hughes created the 2014 event, Clara's Big Ride. Over 110 days, she cycled over 11,000 kilometres around Canada, visiting 95 communities to spread her message. After visiting each province and territory, Hughes' trip ended in Ottawa on Canada Day of that year. The following January, a documentary about Clara's interactions over the trip aired on Bell Media-owned CTV.

In addition to Hughes, the Bell Let's Talk movement has two major groups of support leaders: Experts and Ambassadors. Experts of the movement include 22 people, primarily with medical and higher degrees; their primary role is to offer support and raise awareness for mental health initiatives. By contrast, Ambassadors of the movement include 6 people whose lives are all within the public eye; their primary role is to inspire change about how mental illness and health are discussed. The program is also supported by dozens of other self-described "team members", whose stories surrounding their experiences with mental health are promoted on the Bell Let's Talk website and other Bell Media properties leading up to Bell Let's Talk Day.

=== Post-secondary outreach ===
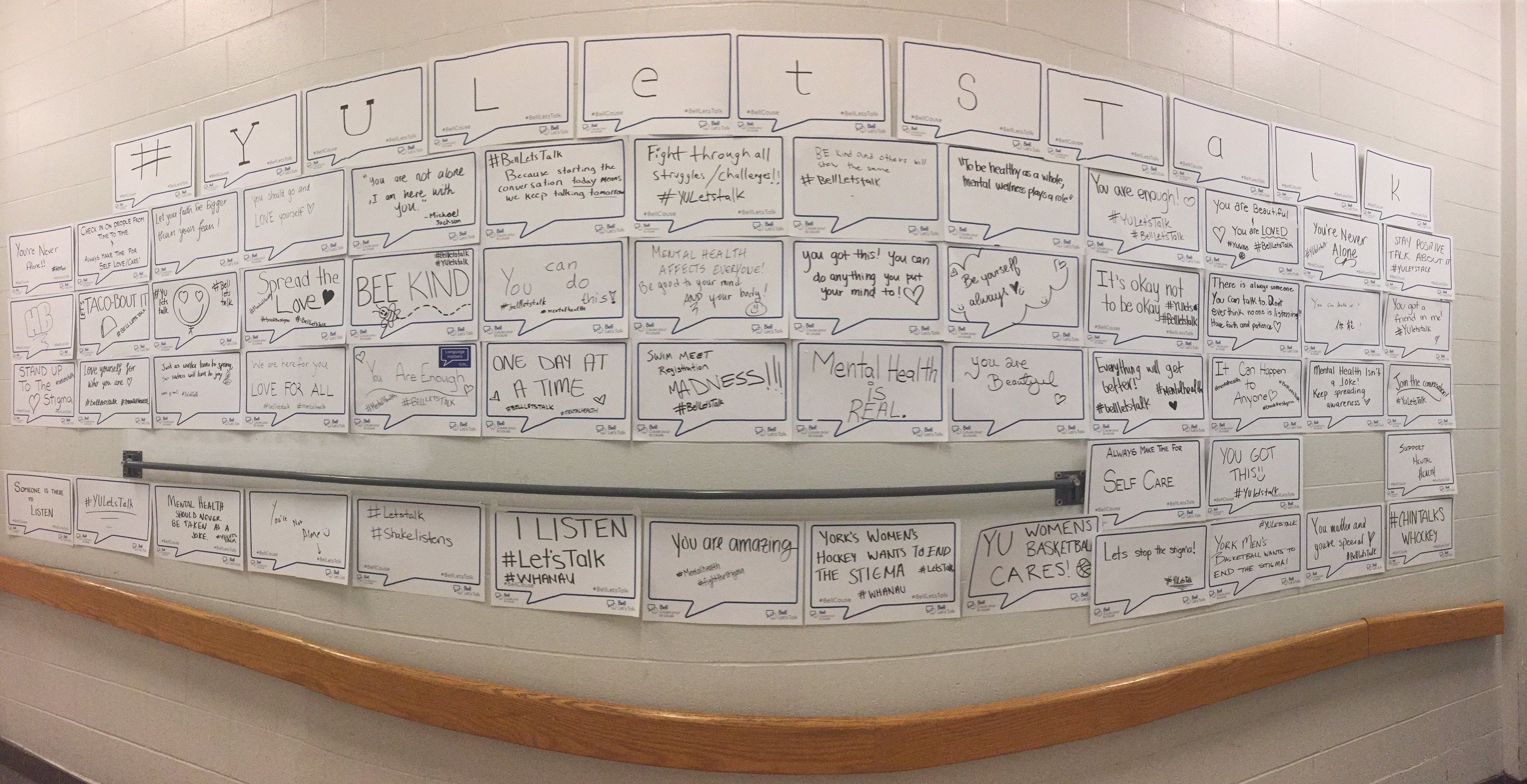
A wall of speech bubble posts at York University in Toronto used to promote the Bell Let's Talk program.

Many Canadian post-secondary institutions have programs associated with the Bell Let's Talk initiative. The York Lions athletics program from York University in Toronto hosts various events throughout the month of the event, encouraging students to create posters with messages of support, and offering prizes that can be won through participating with the #BellLetsTalk hashtag. The posters are part of Bell's community program, with speech bubble templates sent to schools and businesses across Canada. Brock University led the creation of their Thrive Week, a series of events coinciding with Bell Let's Talk day to promote self-care and mental health awareness in the school. Their hashtag #LetsThriveBrockU was designed to be used in conjunction with the #BellLetsTalk hashtag to spread awareness in the school. In addition, Toronto Metropolitan University (previously Ryerson University) presented a campus activity day on Bell Let's Talk Day in 2018, called the "Sprinkle of Self-Love" event. Presented by Ryerson's tri-mentoring program, the event included food, games, and a photo booth to promote sharing images on Instagram using the hashtag.

Canadian university athletics league U Sports widely promotes the Bell Let's Talk program throughout their member institutions. A majority of schools from the AUS, RESQ, OUA and CWUAA divisions all participated in various events over the course of January 2018. Through 100 schools, over 20,000 student-athletes participated in the outreach programs. Spokesperson Clara Hughes played a large role in the partnership, stating that "athletes are deeply involved in campus life and passionate about their school communities, and I offer my heartfelt thanks to them all for bringing their incredible energy and ideas to the mental health cause."

== Timeline since Inception ==
=== 2011 ===
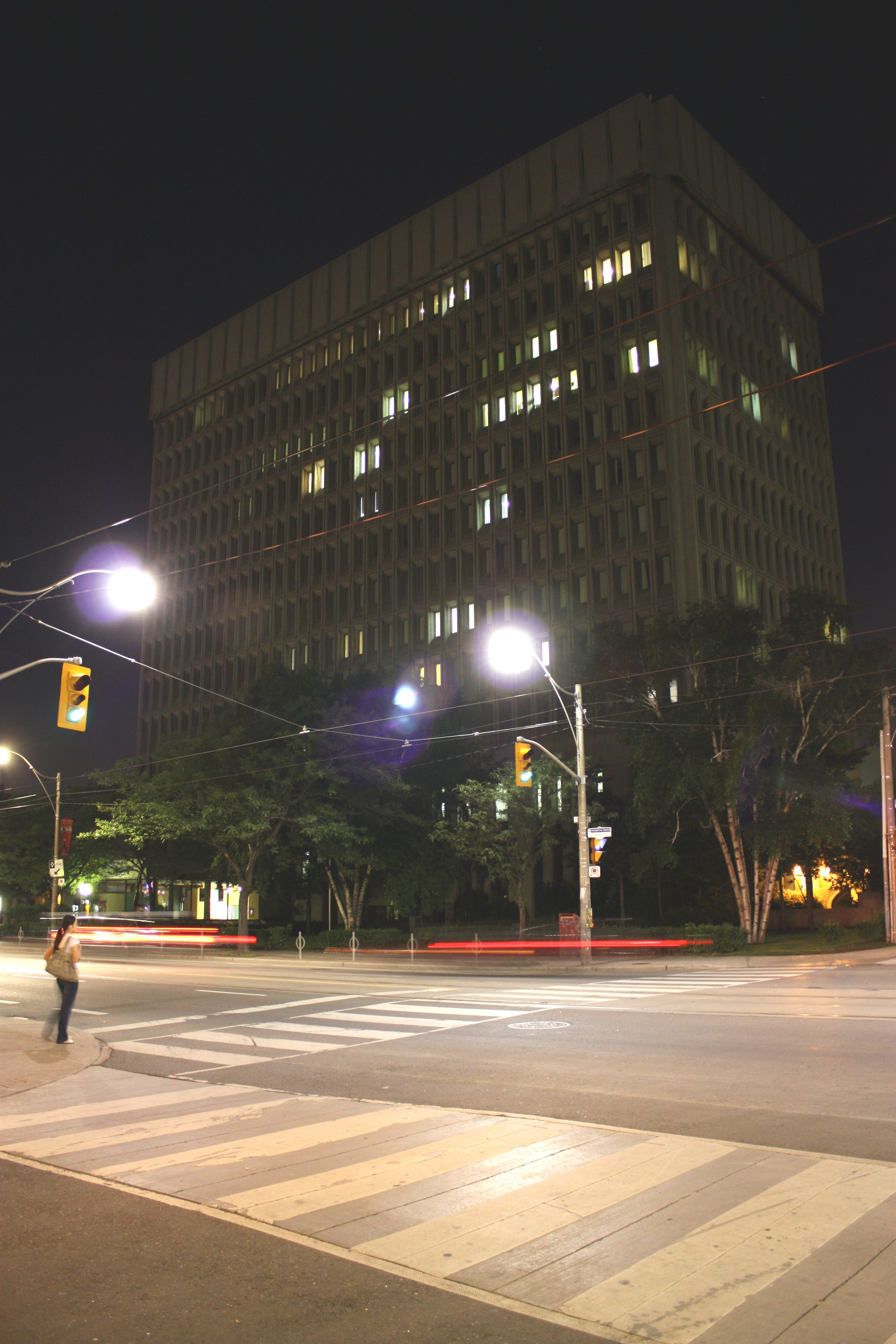
The Centre for Addiction and Mental Health in Toronto was recipient of a $10 million donation in 2011, the largest corporate mental health donation at the time.

In addition to the inaugural $1 million donation to the Royal Ottawa Hospital Foundation, the Fondation Hôpital Charles-Lemoyne and Streetohome Foundation respectively received $300,000 and $250,000, and the University of British Columbia was granted $1 million towards their research programs.

In addition, the largest corporate donation to a mental health initiative in Canada at the time was a $10 million endowment to the Centre for Addiction and Mental Health. When the announcement was made on May 11, 2011, Bell CEO George Cope stated that it was part of "a new era for mental health in Canada."

=== 2012 ===
Following the 2012 Bell Let's Talk day, $2 million in donations were made to the Douglas-Bell Brain Bank in Montreal. Since its opening in 1980, it has become one of the largest brain banks in the world with a collection of over 3,000 brains in various conditions of physical and mental health. They are a major contributor to many research projects focused on mental health initiatives.

Other donations include $200,000 and $150,000, respectively given to the Fondation Cité de la Santé and the Ontario Shores Foundation. Additionally, a grant given to Queen's University in Kingston was used to create a position for the Chair of Mental Health and Anti-Stigma Research.

=== 2013 ===
Following the 2013 campaign, a $1 million contribution went to the True Patriot Love Fund, a Canadian foundation established in 2009 to help support soldiers and military families deal with the mental health issues associated with a return from service. Since their founding, they have raised over $25 million for various research and rehabilitation programs.

A second $1 million donation went to Brain Canada, a convenor for neurological and mental health research across Canada. Since their 2011 partnership with Health Canada, their research fund has been designed to increase contributions to brain research and monitor their investments across the nation.

Other contributions that year include $500,000 to Concordia University, $230,000 to Jewish General Hospital Foundation, and $1 million to Fondation de l'Institut universitaire en santé mentale de Montréal.

=== 2014 ===
2014 was marked by a $1 million contribution to Bell Let's Talk's own fund in support of Canada's northern territories; in addition, the donation went towards a newly established partnership with the Alberta Government to provide better mental health support for youth in the province.

The nationwide Kids Help Phone service also received a $2.5 million donation to assist with their goal of providing telephone and text mental health counselling to kids in both English and French. They noted in their end of year report that it was the largest corporate donation they had ever received.

The year's other major gifts were also aimed at strengthening mental health resources for children across Canada. $1 million to the Sunnybrook Health Sciences Centre, $500,000 to the Universite de Montreal, and $225,000 to the Universite Laval Foundation were all aimed at supporting young people, while $500,000 to McGill University was used to create a wellness portal for students.

=== 2015 ===
Quebec's CHU Sainte-Justine was one of the major recipients of the 2015 funds. The mother-child treatment centre in Montreal had noted a 44% rise over the previous four years in the number of children admitted for eating disorders, and utilized their $500,000 contribution to assist in the building of a new intermediate care centre to monitor and treat these disorders after the patients are discharged. The development is part of CHU Sainte-Justine's better healing campaign, which ran until 2018.

Another $1 million was sent to the VGH UBC Hospital Foundation, who were raising money to support the $82 million expansion project for their hospital's mental health wing. Opening in 2017, its 2,000 inpatients a year make it the largest mental health facility in the province, and one of the largest in Canada.

The final $150,000 went to youth mental health programs in Nunatsiavut.

=== 2016 ===
In January 2016, Bell announced several donations. A $150,000 donation to the Canadian Red Cross gave the Red Cross the opportunity to create a mental health first aid course. Much like traditional first aid certification courses, the Red Cross' new mental health first aid course aims to provide first responders with the knowledge necessary to recognize the signs and symptoms of someone in distress, and assist with their treatment until help arrives. A second course, aimed specifically at treating people who are experiencing distress related to severe trauma and disasters, also was created that year.

Another $500,000 was pledged in support of the Ontario-based RISE development program. The micro-financing program was designed to support the over 70% of people with mental illness or addiction issues who are unemployed because of their condition. By supporting them through education and small business loans, RISE works to help them become entrepreneurs. In 2016, the program was beginning to be introduced across the country, and the money from the Bell Let's Talk donation was being used for that expansion.

Other 2016 programs included $500,000 to the Government of Yukon to launch a group-based intervention program for youth, and $1 million to research at l'Institut universitaire en santé mentale de Québec to detect early signs of illness in children.

=== 2017 ===
The largest contribution from the 2017 campaign was a joint investment of $2 million between Bell and the Provincial Governments of the four Atlantic provinces, towards the Strongest Families Institute. The program, which was started by two professors from Dalhousie University in Nova Scotia, works to provide counseling and other mental health programs through online courses and telephone advising to lower travel costs for families. The institute was the winner of the 2017 Governor General's Innovation Award, and the donation was met enthusiastically endorsed by the government. Robert Henderson, PEI's Minister of Health and Wellness stated that "With a 90 percent success rate, Strongest Families is customized to each family's needs and provides timely and efficient treatment that helps our young people and their caregivers."

Another $250,000 donation to the Embrace Life Council in Nunavut was aimed at helping spread awareness and education at the community level surrounding suicide prevention. The Iqaluit-based institute is committed to combating the high rate of suicide in the Northern Territories, who suffer a disproportionate number of Canada's estimated 11 suicides per day.

Like the previous year, $150,000 was donated towards the increase of mental health first aid awareness, this time to St. John Ambulance. Their 2017 agreement with Mental Health First Aid foundation was aimed at increasing the number of instructors trained in mental health first aid, with the goal of eventually integrating it into most first aid courses.

The McGill University Montreal Neurological Institute and Hospital received $250,000 for their research project that would span the next three years looking into the different ways that mental health issues are observed and treated across cultures. The hospital's Multicultural Human Resource Centre was also being expanded as part of the project, being translated into several more languages to offer support across cultural boundaries.

Other major gifts in 2017 included $200,000 in partnership with Unifor given to Manitoba's Ma Mawi Wi Chi Itata Centre for Indigenous mental health. Quebec's CISSS de Lanaudiere received $300,000 from each Bell and the Quebec Government, and Queen's University in Kingston renewed their $1 million donation from 2012.

=== 2018 ===
Outside of the $2 million Community Funds, there were four main major gifts that the Bell Let's Talk program donated to following the Bell Let's Talk Day 2018. The largest was a $1 million donation to the Mental Health Commission of Canada in partnership with the Rossy Family Foundation, intended to be used to fund the creation of a national standard for post-secondary mental health. The two-year long research program is being conducted by the Mental Health Commission, together with the Canadian Standards Association to build optional guidelines can use and follow in the design of their mental health outreach programs. The goals of the program are to promote student success through health and safety, and as an estimated 75% of mental health problems are first diagnosed between the ages of 16 and 25, they aim to combat the issues as they begin.

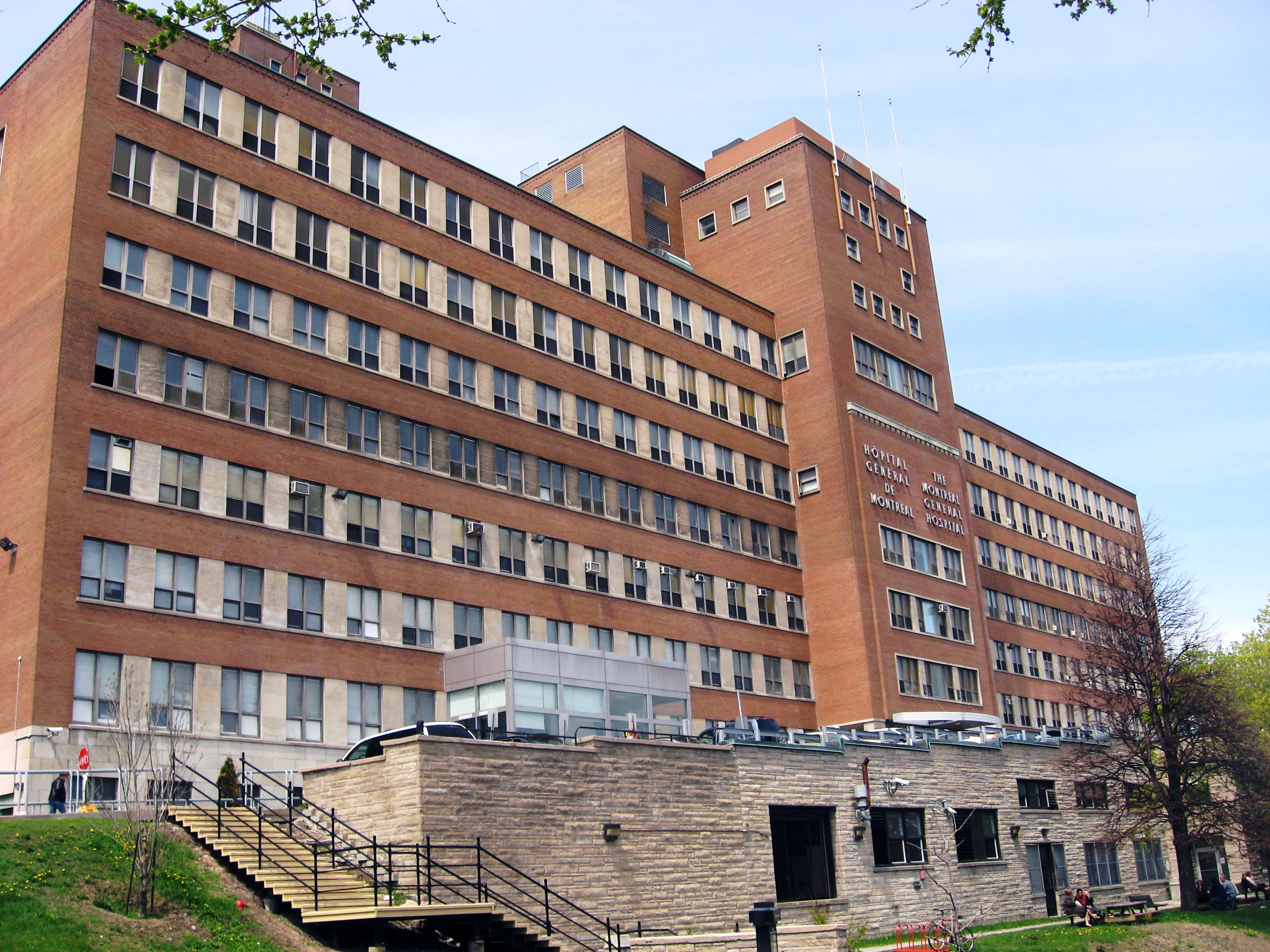
The Montreal General Hospital received a donation towards the purchase of their repetitive Transcranial Magnetic Stimulation Machine.

The second major gift was $400,000 for the purchase of a repetitive Transcranial Magnetic Stimulation machine by the Montreal General Hospital Foundation. According to the McGill University Health Centre, the machine will help grant greater access for their Mental Health Mission and the people they support to the Neuromodulation Unit. The device is used to assist people coping with various mood disorders who, because of complications and side effects, cannot use traditional medication. The machine works by focusing its magnetic field on specific areas of the patient's brain, changing the neural connections in the area affected by the disorder. The donation was enthusiastically received by the foundation according to Michaela Barbarosie, director of the Neuromodulation Unit. "This donation from Bell Let's Talk is great news for mental health patients, particularly those who do not tolerate medications due to their side effects," she said, "Being able to improve access for more patients to non-invasive treatment that does not affect cognitive function and that has few to no side effects is invaluable."

Third, $150,000 was granted to Ogijiita Pimatiswin Kinamatwin (OPK), a Winnipeg-based foundation that works to provide education and life support for at-risk youth and young adults from Indigenous communities in Manitoba. OPK focuses primarily on underprivileged Indigenous youth who are suffering from the intergenerational impact of the Indian Residential School (IRS) system on their culture and economy. Founded in 2001 by Chief Larry Morrissette, OPK has been growing steadily, with approximately 75 new participants per year. By 2022, they plan to have 600 participants taking part in the program, and they are putting the money from the Bell Let's Talk initiative towards this expansion.

Finally, $500,000 were committed to the Institut universitaire en santé mentale de Montréal Foundation and specifically the institution's research centre. The foundation works through supporting clinical and scientific projects that promote the reintegration of patients into society.

At the end of Bell Let's Talk Day 2018, the initiative had amassed 138,383,995 interactions across the various participating social platforms. This brought the all-time total to 867,449,649 interactions.

=== 2019 ===
Near the end of 2018, Bell estimated that the 2019 program would be able to bring the all-time total interactions with the campaign to one billion. Bell Let's Talk Day 2019 took place on January 30, with the awareness campaign officially beginning on January 3.

In the lead up to January 30, Bell announced several donations. Bell announced support to expand mental health services for young people throughout Manitoba with a joint $1 million donation with the Province of Manitoba to the Strongest Families Institute. A $500,000 donation to the Centre for Research and Intervention on Suicide, Ethical Issues and End-of-Life Practices at the Université du Québec à Montréal will be used to develop a first of its kind project aimed at preventing suicide by making optimal use of today's digital communications tools. CHEO, a pediatric health and research centre in Ottawa, will reduce wait times and improve access to mental health care through the Choice and Partnership Approach (CAPA) program with a $300,000 donation. A $300,000 donation to Accueil Bonneau, Welcome Hall Mission and the Old Brewery Mission will support their work caring for those coping with homelessness in Montréal. Bell joined two other partners, the Sens Foundation and Danbe Foundation to support Youth Services Bureau with a donation of $500,000 to support a youth hub.

January 30 saw a record 145,442,699 interactions with social media engagement on Twitter, Facebook, Instagram and Snapchat up 13%.

In April, Bell announced a $240,000 donation to the Behavioural Health Foundation in Winnipeg to expand culturally relevant mental health services.

=== 2020 ===
On January 6, 2020, Bell began its tenth annual campaign under the theme "Mental Health: Every Action Counts." The advertising campaign featured eight Canadian organizations delivering frontline access to mental health services throughout the country; the respective organizations were the Canadian Mental Health Association, Canadian Red Cross, Foundry, Jack.org, Kids Help Phone, Revivre, St. John Ambulance and the Strongest Families Institute.

On January 15, Bell Let's Talk, the Government of the Northwest Territories, and Northwestel announced a $500,000 donation to the Strongest Families Institute to provide mental health services throughout the territory. Programs will be available in both English and French in late January. The Strongest Families Institute's programming was co-designed with partners, including Indigenous advisors.

The Peguis First Nation and SunLodge Village received a donation of $110,000 on January 21 to help create a traditional camp for at-risk, Indigenous youth on Peguis First Nation, called the Bell Spirit and the Land Excursion Camp.

On January 28, Bell announced a $225,000 donation to the Fondation de ma vie towards the refurbishment of five psychiatric departments at 3 different hospitals in Saguenay‒Lac-Saint-Jean. The funding was matched with a $75,000 investment by the foundation.

2020 marked another record year for Bell Let's Talk in terms of interactions and press. More than 154 million interactions were counted, making Bell's donation grow by $7.7 million. Celebrities like Prince Harry and Meghan Markle joined in this year, as did Ellen DeGeneres, Prime Minister Justin Trudeau and Ryan Reynolds.

On March 9, Bell announced a new $10M partnership with the Graham Boeckh Foundation to support integrated youth mental health and wellness services across Canada, with the first donation going to Quebec's Aire ouverte centers.

To address the growing needs of Canadians around the COVID-19 crisis, Bell Let's Talk announced on March 26 donations totaling $5 million to increase resources with support for Canadian Red Cross, Canadian Mental Health Association, Kids Help Phone, Revivre and Strongest Families Institute.

In March 2020, Bell Canada announced a 5-year renewal of the #BellLetsTalk initiative, committing a total of $155 million in donations. Later in March 2020, Bell Let's Talk announced an increase of $5 million in donations in response to COVID-19; all $5 million has been donated to 5 mental health organizations that are delivering services to frontline Canadian healthcare workers.

On July 30, Bell Let's Talk announced a new $5M Diversity Fund to support Black, Indigenous and People of Colour communities. Initial donations of $250,000 were given to Black Youth Helpline and National Association of Friendship Centres.

=== 2021 ===
Bell announced its theme for the 2021 campaign: When it comes to mental health, now more than ever, every action counts. And confirms that the total donation made is now $113,415,135 (which includes the company's original $50 million anchor donation when Bell Let's Talk launched in 2010, plus an additional $5 million dedicated to COVID-19 response). Two Nova Scotia hospitals will soon offer a new type of treatment for depression, PTSD and other mental health disorders thanks to a donation of $420,000 from Bell Let's Talk on January 7. Repetitive transcranial magnetic stimulation (rTMS), which involves sending short, magnetic pulses to the brain to stimulate nerve cells, will be offered at the Nova Scotia Hospital in Dartmouth and the Valley Regional Hospital in Kentville. On January 13, Bell launched a new $2.5 million Bell Let's Talk Post-Secondary Fund to support Canadian colleges and universities in implementing the National Standard of Canada and Well-Being for Post-Secondary Students. Schools can apply for a $25k kickoff grant to help cover the costs with starting the Standard. There will be another opportunity to get funding for specific student mental health initiatives beginning in the spring. The following day, Bell Let's Talk donated $500k to youth organization Jack.org to equip Jack Chapter leaders with training, mentorship and digital education tools to support the mental health of young people across the country.

On January 20, Bell unveiled their next round of recipients from the Diversity Fund, created in 2020. $1 million in donations went to African Community Wellness Initiative, Centre des jeunes l'Escale de Montréal-Nord, Hillside Elementary School at Kettle and Stony Point First Nation, Mosaic Newcomer Family Resource Network, North End Community Health Association, Pour 3 Points, Yorktown Family Services and Yukon University. On January 21, Bell announced a $300,000 donation from Bell Let's Talk to support CHU Sainte-Justine's intensive ambulatory care eating disorder program through a pilot project benefitting teenage patients across Québec. The donation will not only help the program adapt to the COVID-19 context, it will permanently increase access to Sainte-Justine's expertise for patients living outside of Montréal, who represent 75% of its clientele.

On January 26, Bell Let's Talk and Brain Canada announced the new Bell Let's Talk-Brain Canada Mental Health Research Program to accelerate Canadian brain research while helping to address the impacts of COVID-19 on mental health care. Funding for the program is made up of a $2 million gift from Bell Let's Talk matched by the federal government (Health Canada) through the Canada Brain Research Fund (CBRF). Results from the 2021 Bell Let's Talk Day are in with 159,173,435 interactions tallied up throughout the day. That means Bell is donating another $7,958,671.75 to Canadian mental health programs. On April 15, Bell announced 123 colleges and universities that received donations of $25,000 each as part of the Post-Secondaey fund. In May, Bell Let's Talk announced another commitment of $1 million to Rise to engage Canadians with mental health/addiction challenges in entrepreneurship training, mentorship & lending, and their expansion into Manitoba through the creation of Rise Winnipeg. On May 6, Bell announced the latest recipients of its Diversity Fund with $750,000 in donations. Organizations that received funding were: Delta Family Resource Centre, MOSAIC, Nurrait/Jeunes Karibus, Maisons Transitionelles, TAIBU Community Health Centre, and Wabano. In October, Bell Let's Talk and iHeartRadio launched a brand new podcast, "From Where We Stand: Conversations on race and mental health" hosted by Anne-Marie Mediwake, Jamar McNeil and the late Candy Palmater. The 6-episode season is released every Wednesday and highlights the experiences of Black, Indigenous and People of Colour (BIPOC) communities and their impact on mental health.

=== 2022 ===
Bell kicked off its 12th annual campaign on January 4 and are encouraging Canadians to support themselves and one another by taking action: keep listening, keep talking and keep being there. As part of their campaign launch, Bell CEO Mirko Bibic announced unlimited mental health coverage for Bell employees and their eligible family members. On January 12, Bell announced $1 million in donations to 16 post-secondary schools around Canada, including University of New Brunswick, Assiniboine Community College, the University of Calgary, Centennial College, George Brown College, Humber College, Seneca Collage, Sheridan College, Lakehead University, McMaster University, University of Waterloo, Cégep de Sherbrooke, École de technologie supérieure, Université de Montréal, Université de Sherbrooke and Université du Québec à Chicoutimi. The Diversity Fund announced $600,000 in new grants to 6 organizations: Black Youth Success, Life with a Baby, L'Hybridé, Kitikmeot Heritage Society, Nisa Helpline and Wolf Lake First Nation.

2022's Bell Let's Talk Day logged 164,298,820 interactions, leading to a record donation by Bell of $8,214,941.

=== 2023 ===
Bell has committed to donating $10 million to organizations that support mental health issues instead of continuing to pledge 5¢ per text or social media interaction.

== Controversy ==
=== Corporatization of Mental Health ===
As Jason Magder notes in the Montreal Gazette, "It's one thing to give a bunch of money to help improve mental health. And it's quite another to try to benefit from free advertising at the same time. Or at least so goes the argument against Bell's initiative to help combat mental health." In an article in the Toronto lifestyle blog Torontoist entitled "Let's Talk About The Corporatization of Mental Health", Hana Shafi quotes mental health advocate Lucy Costa who alleges that there is a disconnect between the profit-motives of a company like Bell and effective strategies for combatting mental health challenges. Costa notes, "This is a profoundly different agenda than trying to make sense and meaning of the impact of poverty, isolation, disconnection—including digital disconnection—that so many experience when outcast from the social world due to prejudice." Costa, along with other local journalists and advocates, have identified similar concerns about Bell's alleged corporatization of mental health issues. However, Bell Canada has responded to the accusations saying that, "they put their name on the campaign because no one else would address mental health."

=== Treatment of Bell employees ===
Additional criticism came with Bell's alleged treatment of an employee with mental health issues. Maria McLean worked as a radio host for a Grand Falls, New Brunswick station owned by Bell Canada. The CBC reported she was fired "just one hour after sharing her struggles with mental illness with her colleagues and giving her supervisor a doctor's note stating that she needed two weeks off work to adjust to her new medication." McLean specifically noted the irony in her treatment, contrasting with the Bell Let's Talk initiative and "feels the company has the right intentions, but with better treatment during her own personal mental health problems, the company could have put its money where its mouth is.". Bell's media director at the time, Matthew Garrow, responded to the comment stating that, "While we [Bell] would not normally comment on specific employee issues, I can confirm that Bell does not dismiss employees because of mental health issues, in this case or any other.".

=== Profits from the Ontario prison phone system ===
Criminal defense lawyer Michael Spratt said in an interview on CBC Radio's As It Happens, "Bell Canada is profiting off inmates who face high levels of mental illness and preventing them from reaching much needed support systems." He also states, "Calls are restrictively expensive and difficult, preventing inmates, who are often mentally ill, from talking to their counsellors, families or broader support systems." This follows a freedom of information request in 2017, which revealed in detailed documents that the Ontario government collects a commission from every collect call made from provincial jails, based on a percentage of all gross monthly revenue. The documents also included multiple redactions hiding the exact phone rate Bell charges and the exact percentage of commissions.

Bell and the Ontario government have both refused to reveal their profit coming from inmates. The interview also points out that calls made from jail must be to a landline who can accept a collect call. In February 2017, an inmate with schizophrenia, Cleve Geddes, died two days after being found hanging in his segregated cell. Geddes's family could not receive calls from him since they did not own a landline. One of the 48 recommendations from that inquest included changing the phone system in jail. Spratt concludes that while Bell receives engagement and support for a fraction of their profits, some of the profits are coming from the most marginalized, victimized and vulnerable people with mental health issues. However, a spokesperson for Bell said, "the province set the terms of its contract, and rates for inmates are the same as for the general public."

In 2023, the Court of Appeal for Ontario temporarily stayed an ongoing class action claiming that Bell's Ontario prison phone system charged "exorbitant" rates and ordered that the Canadian Radio-television and Telecommunications Commission should review it to see if it had jurisdiction over the reasonableness of prison phone rates and that it should only return to the courts in the event of a negative finding by the CRTC. The Ontario Superior Court of Justice had earlier found that the rates were four times higher than rates charged to inmates in other provinces.

The CRTC ordered Bell to reveal its revenue from the 2013 to 2021 deal as the public interest outweighed any potential harm to the corporation. In August 2024, its documents showed that Bell had made $64 million in gross revenue, of which $39 million was given to the Ontario government as commission. The CRTC also found that the new deal that replaced the Bell deal was significantly cheaper for inmates, with a system for prepaid calling cards in addition to collect calls, and a long distance rate of a few cents per minute instead of a dollar per minute for long distance calls. In December 2024, the CRTC found that it did not have Ontario prison phone rates are not subject to CRTC approval, opening the door for the case to return to the courts, though it also indicated that it would collect information on the issue moving forward.
