= Jennifer Camelon =

Administrator of the Royal Canadian Mint

Master of the Royal Canadian Mint
- In office July 2, 2018 – January 21, 2019
- Minister: Bill Morneau
- Preceded by: Sandra Hanington
- Succeeded by: Marie Lemay

Personal details
- Education: Queen's University

Jennifer Camelon is the former interim master (president and CEO) of the Royal Canadian Mint, and currently serves as its chief financial officer and senior vice president of finance and administration. She held the position from July 2, 2018, following the resignation of Sandra Hanington, until the appointment of Marie Lemay to the role on January 21, 2019. She was the fifth woman to serve in this capacity, following Ruth Hubbard, Danielle Wetherup, Marguerite Nadeau and Hanington.

== Education ==
Camelon obtained a Bachelor of Commerce (Honours) from Queen's University in Kingston, Ontario. In addition, she is a Chartered Professional Accountant (CPA) (CA).

== Career ==
Prior to her appointment as Master of the Mint, she served as the firm's chief financial officer and vice-president of finance and administration, appointed to the role in January 2015. Before joining the firm, Camelon was the chief financial officer for QNX Software Systems, a subsidiary of the BlackBerry enterprise.

Government offices
Preceded by Sandra Hanington	Master of the Royal Canadian Mint; July 2, 2018 - January 21, 2019	Succeeded by Marie Lemay
