= Ian Bennett =

Ian Bennett may refer to:

- Ian Bennett (footballer) (born 1971), English footballer and goalkeeper
- Ian Bennett (soccer) (born 1983), Canadian soccer player
- Ian Bennett (Royal Canadian Mint President) (1948–2018)
- Ian Bennett, musician and former member of Threshold
