= MintChip =

Digital currency created by the Royal Canadian Mint

Screenshot of the MintChip app homepage on an Android phone.

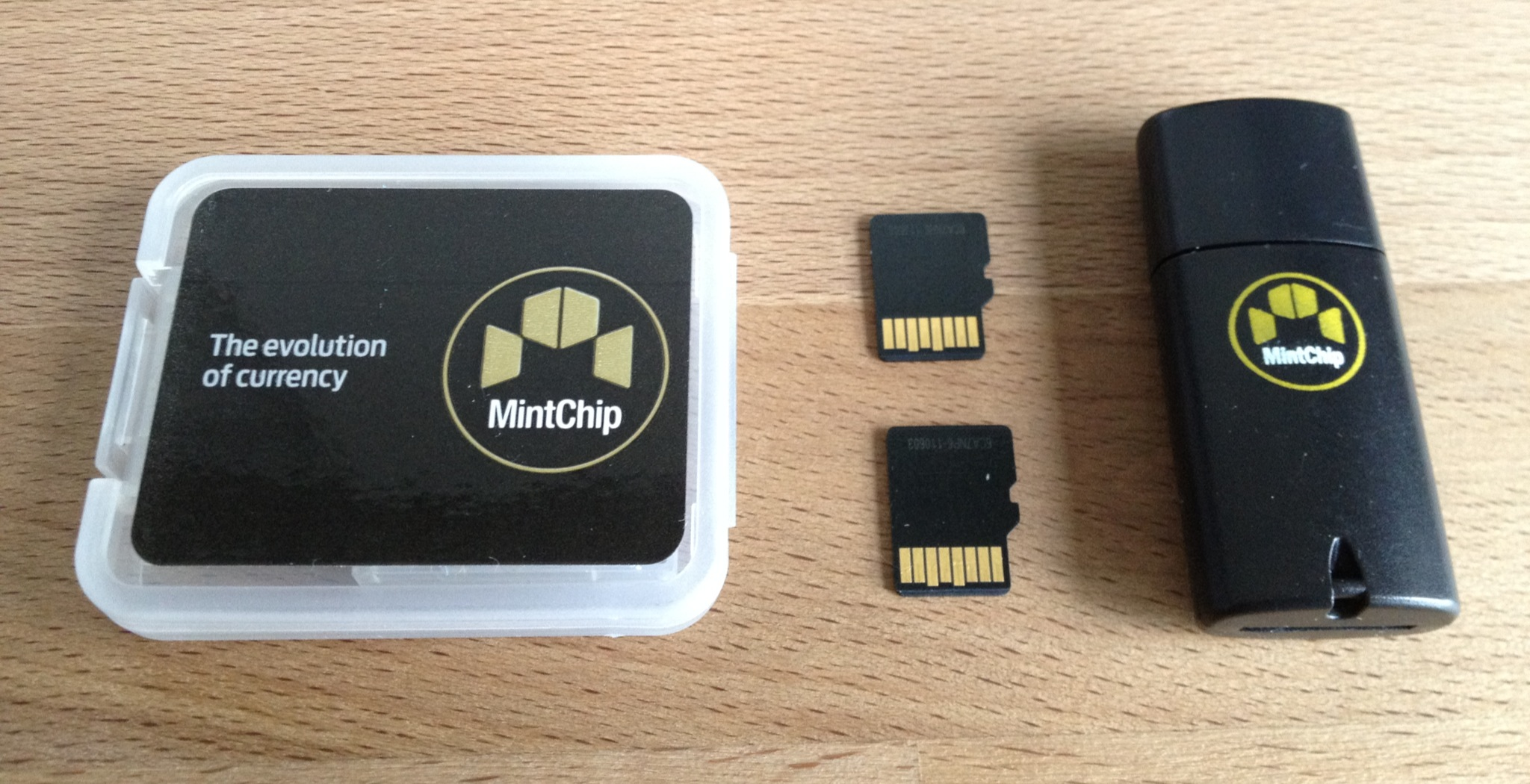
A pair of MintChips (centre) and accessories from the Mint.

MintChip is a digital currency that provides the underlying system to facilitate the exchange of value between consumers and merchants in real-time. It was designed to reduce the cost and risk of financial transactions. This technology was created by the Royal Canadian Mint, backed by the Government of Canada and denominated in a variety of fiat currencies. The Royal Canadian Mint announced the MintChip project in 2012 and simultaneously launched the MintChip Challenge contest to encourage development of interesting uses for the MintChip. In January 2016, Loyalty Pays Holdings corporation—a wholly owned subsidiary of nanoPay, a fully integrated loyalty and payments platform provider, announced the acquisition of all assets related to MintChip.

Created to be the first regulator-friendly digital cash platform, MintChip was designed to support compliance of regulatory standards including anti-money laundering (AML) and know your customer (KYC) rules. MintChip is a digital replacement for cash linked to a country's fiat currency. MintChip uses secure asset stores to move funds between parties without an intermediary and can process transactions both online and offline.

== Challenge ==
The Mint ran a challenge during the summer of 2012 to develop apps and ideas for how MintChip could be used. The prizes included $50,000 in gold bullion. Winners included a wallet app for Windows Phone 7, an app to donate micropayments to charity with every transaction you perform, and a mobile checkout/point of sale app.

The challenge also had a public voting component for the ideas section. The top 25 ideas would then be narrowed down to top 10 by a panel of judges.

== Concept ==
British cryptographic expert David Everett is the technical architect of the MintChip program for the Royal Canadian Mint. A related smartcard initiative, the Mondex cash card was launched experimentally in the United Kingdom in 1994 but failed to attract commercial interest, but MasterCard's implementation of Mondex smartcards in the United States was, as of October 2013, still offered. As of September 2013, Marc Brûlé, CFO of the Royal Canadian Mint, had still endorsed the concept and announced the prospect of MintChip 2.0. but in April 2014 the Mint announced a halt to the program and the intention to sell off their MintChip development assets to the private sector.

== Privatization ==
On January 12, 2016, it was announced that MintChip had been sold to Toronto-based nanoPay.

== See also ==
- ecash
- eCache
- egold
- Ven (currency)
- Bitcoin
