= List of foreign countries with coinage struck at the Royal Canadian Mint =

Since its opening in 1908, the Royal Canadian Mint has produced coinage and planchets for over 80 countries. This list of foreign countries with coinage struck at the Royal Canadian Mint lists countries that have been serviced by the Crown corporation, as listed on the website of the Canadian Numismatic Publishing Institute.

- Algeria
- Argentina
- Australia
- Bahamas
- Bangladesh
- Barbados – As recently as 2004–2005
- Bermuda
- Bolivia
- Botswana
- Brazil
- Cayman Islands
- China
- Colombia
- Costa Rica
- Cuba
- Cyprus
- Czech Republic
- Dominica
- Dominican Republic
- Ecuador
- El Salvador
- Ethiopia
- Fiji
- Ghana
- Guatemala
- Haiti
- Honduras
- Hong Kong
- Iceland
- India
- Indonesia
- Iran
- Iraq
- Israel
- Italy
- Jamaica
- Jordan
- Lebanon
- Macau
- Madagascar
- Malawi
- Malaysia
- Mexico
- Nepal
- Netherlands Antilles
- New Zealand
- Dominion of Newfoundland (prior to joining Canadian Confederation)
- Nicaragua
- Norway
- Oman
- Panama
- Papua New Guinea
- Philippines
- Portugal
- Singapore
- Slovakia
- Spain
- Sri Lanka
- Syria
- Taiwan (Republic of China)
- Tanzania
- Thailand
- Trinidad and Tobago
- Tunisia
- Turks & Caicos
- Uganda
- Ukraine
- United Arab Emirates
- United Kingdom
- Venezuela
- Yemen
- Zambia

== Early history of RCM foreign circulation ==
In 1970, Master of the Mint Gordon Ward Hunter relaunched the Foreign Circulation division. In January 1970, the RCM won a contract from Singapore to produce six million rimmed blanks in a cupronickel alloy. This was the Mint's first export contract since a contract for the Dominican Republic 32 years earlier. The second contract came in April 1970 from the Central Bank of Brazil. The RCM produced 84 million blanks for the 50-centavo piece. In August 1971, the People's Democratic Republic of Yemen placed an order for 2 million five-fil pieces. This was followed by an order from Iceland for 2.5 million one-crown pieces.

In October 1971, the Bank of Jamaica asked the RCM to produce a commemorative ten-dollar coin in sterling silver, and a twenty-dollar gold coin of proof quality. Also in 1971, the RCM made coins for the Bahamas, Bermuda, Cayman Islands, and the Isle of Man. An order for 100 million general circulation five-centime and ten-centimo coins for Venezuela was received as well. By 1973, orders totalled sixty-five million coins and seventy million blanks. By 1974, the Ottawa facility produced a total of 1.2 billion coins (foreign and domestic), a facility record.
