= Marguerite Nadeau =

Marguerite Nadeau was Master of the Royal Canadian Mint from October 3, 2005, to June 11, 2006.

She joined the Mint in 1984 as a legal counsel, after working for seven years under the Minister of Supply and Services. In 1985, she became Corporate Secretary of the Mint; in 1990 she was appointed Queen's Counsel, and in 2003, she became Vice-President of Legal and Corporate Affairs.

Following the resignation of David Dingwall in September 2005, the Royal Canadian Mint Board of Directors announced that Marguerite Nadeau would serve as interim President and CEO (known affectionately as Master of the Mint) for a period of 60 days. Dingwall, a former Cabinet minister under Prime Minister Jean Chrétien was facing an inquiry after opposition members revealed that his office claimed more than $740,000 in expenses in the previous year.

In late December 2005, Nadeau's appointment as Master of the Mint was extended indefinitely. Her extension required approval of the Canadian government through Order in Council. The reason for the indefinite extension was attributed to the Mint still searching for a new President and CEO. Her term ended in June 2006 with the appointment of Ian Bennett.

Preceded by David Dingwall	Royal Canadian Mint President; 2005–2006	Succeeded by Ian Bennett
