= Ian Bennett (Royal Canadian Mint President) =

Ian E. Bennett (8 June 1948 – 22 January 2018) was a Master of the Royal Canadian Mint (President and CEO). He held this position from June 12, 2006, and his mandate was extended to 2014. Prior to his appointment, Bennett held several positions within the Department of Finance including Deputy Minister from November 2004 to June 2006. He also served as Executive Director of the International Monetary Fund representing Canada, Ireland and the Caribbean countries from September 2001 to October 2004.

Bennett has also held other senior positions within the federal government including Associate Deputy Minister of Finance and G7 Deputy for Canada from 1998 to 2001, Associate Deputy Minister of Revenue Canada and Deputy Secretary to the Cabinet (Operations). Born in Nelson, British Columbia, he held a Bachelor of Arts degree (First Class Honours Economics/Commerce) from Simon Fraser University and a Masters of Arts degree in Economics from the University of Toronto.

As President of the Royal Canadian Mint, Bennett's notable accomplishments included the introduction of the new Mint Mark on all Canadian Circulation Coins and the partnership with the Vancouver Organizing Committee to produce coins for the 2010 Winter Olympic and 2010 Winter Paralympics. He died on January 22, 2018, after a brief illness.

== Career ==
- On March 16, 1998, C. Scott Clark, the Finance Deputy Minister announced that Bennett was given added responsibilities as G-7 Deputy and Finance Sous-Sherpa.
- In September 1996, he was appointed Associate Deputy Minister of Finance. Duties included providing advice on matters of concern to the Department generally. Bennett was given special responsibility in the areas of Crown Corporations, Financial Sector Policy, Economic Development Policy and Legal Services.
- From November 1994 to September 1996, Bennett was the associate Deputy Minister at Revenue Canada.
- From February 1993 to November 1994, Bennett was with the Privy Council Office where he was Deputy Secretary to the Cabinet (Operations).
- Before 1993, Bennett held many senior positions within Canada's Department of Finance, including:

| Title | Department | Period |
|---|---|---|
| Senior Assistant Deputy Minister | Tax Policy | 1989 to 1993 |
| Assistant Deputy Minister | Economic Development Policy | 1986 to 1989 |
| General Director | Economic Development Policy | 1985 to 1986 |
| Assistant Secretary | Economic Development Policy | 1984 to 1985 |

== Personal ==
- His niece, Hawley Bennett competed in the Equestrian competition at the 2004 Summer Olympics and 2012 Summer Olympics.
- Ian had been married to Mary Alice MacNeil since 1993. The couple have 3 grown children and 7 grandsons and one grand daughter.
- Ian died from kidney failure due to lupus on January 22, 2018, at the age of 69.

| Preceded by Marguerite Nadeau (acting) | Royal Canadian Mint President; 2006–2014 | Succeeded by Marc Brulé (Interim) |
