= RESQ =

Brand of energy drink

- Type: Energy drink
- Manufacturer: RESQ INC.
- Country of origin: United States
- Introduced: 1999

RESQ is a brand of energy drink which was originally developed in Austria in 1999 and was intended to be sold exclusively on the North American beverage market. Starting in 2008, the product also became available in Europe and Asia. The brand is owned by a private U.S. corporation named RESQ INC.

The name “RESQ” is a play on words derived from the English word “rescue” and the pronunciations of the single alphabet letter “Q” which is shown as a stylized lifebuoy.

RESQ INC. also designs and produces functional wear and casual clothing for public safety workers and agencies in the United States and Europe. The company holds several patents in different international registered trademark classes for garments produced in Europe and North America mainly intended for fire and rescue services.

== Sponsorship controversy ==
In April 2008, IndyCar Series driver Sarah Fisher announced that RESQ would sponsor her IndyCar team for the 2008 Indianapolis 500. The first race car was redesigned and outfitted with the original blue colors of a RESQ aluminium can.

In May and June 2008, numerous press statements by SFR and media coverage nationwide alleged promised sponsorship payments had not been made. SFR motivated fans to start a campaign and call RESQ's corporate office.

In July 2008, RESQ announced on their website that they had not signed a contract with Sarah Fisher Racing. Instead, RESQ had at one time negotiated with Gravity Motorsports, a subsidiary of Gravity Entertainment, about possible marketing for the drink in the racing business. The contract had not proceeded and negotiations were permanently suspended. Legal action was commenced against Gravity Entertainment, and RESQ apologised to the racing industry and fans.

== General references ==
- Indystar article
- Official INDYCAR article
- Indiana Racing press conference of 8 April 2008 - audio transcript
- Indianapolis Motor Speedway official press conference
- Open Wheeler Racers news release
- F1SA news article
- Motorsports.com article
