= Danielle Wetherup =

Danielle Wetherup was president of the Royal Canadian Mint (also known as Master of the Mint) from October 31, 1994, to December 20, 2002. She was the second woman to be named Master of the Mint. Her predecessor, Ruth Hubbard, was the first woman to be appointed Master of the Mint. At the time of the appointment, Wetherup was 53. Prior to the appointment, she was Associate Deputy Minister of the Environment.

== Government career ==
Her government career started in 1973 as a consultant in the Canada U.S. Relations Division, Department of External Affairs. She would later become the co-ordination directorate, Department of Fisheries and the Environment. Other government positions include vice president, professional services for the Canadian International Development Agency from 1988 to 1993. Prior to that, she was director general for natural resources, Indian and Northern Affairs Canada from 1983 to 1988.

== Education ==
Wetherup holds a Bachelor of Arts degree in political science from Mount Saint Vincent University in Halifax, Nova Scotia. Post-graduate studies in constitutional law were pursued at the London School of Economics.

Preceded by Ruth Hubbard	Royal Canadian Mint President; 1994 - 2002	Succeeded by Emmanuel Triassi (acting)
