= Kids Help Phone =

Canadian youth mental health support service

- Formation: May 16, 1989
- Type: NGO
- Registration no.: 13000 5846 RR0001
- Legal status: Charitable organization
- Purpose: Youth mental health support
- Location: Canada
- President & CEO: Rebecca Shields
- Board of directors: Tracy Sandler (Chair)
- Revenue: $20,729,995 (2019)
- Expenses: $20,423,655 (2019)
- Volunteers: 1,000+ (2020)
- Website: kidshelpphone.ca

Kids Help Phone (French: Jeunesse, J’écoute) is a Canadian charitable organization that provides online and telephone counselling and volunteer-led, text-based support in English and French to youth across Canada. Kids Help Phone also provides information on how to access community support services for youth.

== Organization and activities ==
Kids Help Phone was launched in 1989 and its website was launched in 1996.

The organization expanded its mandate in 2002 from providing counselling to more types of support, including bullying and abuse.

Kids Help Phone provides free and confidential mental health support to Canadian youth. Services were originally telephone based with the more recent provision of text message and internet based text message support. In 2016, Kids Help Line launched BroTalk website and internet based chat services to address the specific mental health needs of young men.

In June 2022, the Canadian government announced a contribution agreement with Kids Help Phone to provide counselling services for young Afghan and Ukrainian refugees in the languages of Dari, Pashto, Ukrainian and Russian. The government indicated it will also provide contributions that will allow Kids Help Phone to hire interpreters in 100 languages by 2025. In 2019, Kids Help Phone began to offer outreach services in Arabic and Mandarin.

The organization's 2023 Feel Out Loud campaign to promote youth mental health was supported by an all-star supergroup recording of Serena Ryder's single "What I Wouldn't Do".

In 2025, Kids Help Phone announced the formation of the KHP Foundation, separating the organization's fundraising and donation and support and counseling services.

== See also ==
- ChildLine - a similar service in the U.K. and Botswana.
- Kids Helpline - a similar service in Australia.
