= Jack.org =

Canadian youth mental health charity

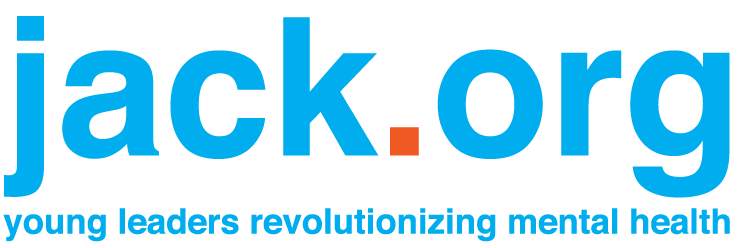
- Formation: 2010
- Founder: Eric Windeler; Sandra Hanington
- Registration no.: 848521837 RR0001
- Legal status: Charitable organization, non-profit organization
- Purpose: Youth mental health, suicide prevention
- Location: Toronto, Ontario, Canada
- Coordinates: 43.650122°N 79.397248°W
- Executive Director: Eric Windeler
- Affiliations: Kids Help Phone
- Revenue: $4,688,752 (2019)
- Expenses: $3,941,208 (2019)
- Website: jack.org
- Formerly called: The Jack Project @ Kids Help Phone

Jack.org (formerly known as The Jack Project under the charitable organization Kids Help Phone) is a Canadian non-profit organization focused on youth mental health and suicide prevention. Founded in 2010, the organization has four main programs: Jack Chapters, Jack Talks, Jack Summit, and Jack Ride.

== History ==
In 2010, Eric Windeler and Sandra Hanington founded "The Jack Project". The project was named after their son, Jack Windeler, who had died by suicide when he was 18 years old. In Jack Windeler's parting letter, he asked for his parents to help others. To honor his wishes, they focused on helping young people struggling with mental health issues.

Initially, the pair collaborated with Kids Help Phone to create the Jack Windeler Memorial Fund in their late son's honor. The fund raised almost $1 million that was used to expand existing health initiatives. They decided to formally launch the Jack Project in April 2010. By July 2010, Eric Windeler had left his software company to work on the Jack Project full-time. In early days, the organization's efforts focused on workshops, outreach programs, and live chat services, which specifically targeted Canadian youth in the age of technology. In addition to their initiatives with Kids Help Phone, they started the Jack Ride program in 2010. This program brings individuals of all ages together to ride their bikes and fund-raise for youth mental health.

In 2012, The Jack Project re-branded to Jack.org.

Today, Jack.org has over 150 active chapters in universities, colleges, and high schools across Canada. The program also maintains more than 80 trained Jack Talks speakers who have delivered 250 talks to date. They also host 200 students annually at a national summit in Toronto, which is the largest youth-led mental health conference.

In May 2018, Ben Sabic — Chair of Kids Help Phone's National Youth Council — led a partnership with Jack.org and the council, to support the organization's "We Are Ready campaign". Through posts across Facebook and Twitter, the goal was to generate greater awareness around the campaign.

=== Royal Recognition ===
On October 1, 2016, Prince William, Duke of Cambridge and Catherine, Duchess of Cambridge accompanied 18 youth mental health advocates from Jack.org on a sailing ride on the Pacific Grace. The Duke and Duchess have made a priority of dispelling the stigma around mental health, as evidence by their campaign, Heads Together. As such, the pair has commended Jack.org on their efforts in the youth mental health space. Prince William has continued to show his support for the organization and made a video appearance at the 2018 Jack Summit.

=== Be There ===
In 2019, Jack.org launched an online mental health resource for young people in Canada called Be There. The resource was launched as part of Mental Health Week, a nationwide initiative by the Canadian Mental Health Association.
