= Kevin S. MacLeod =

Canadian civil servant

Kevin S. MacLeod CVO CD
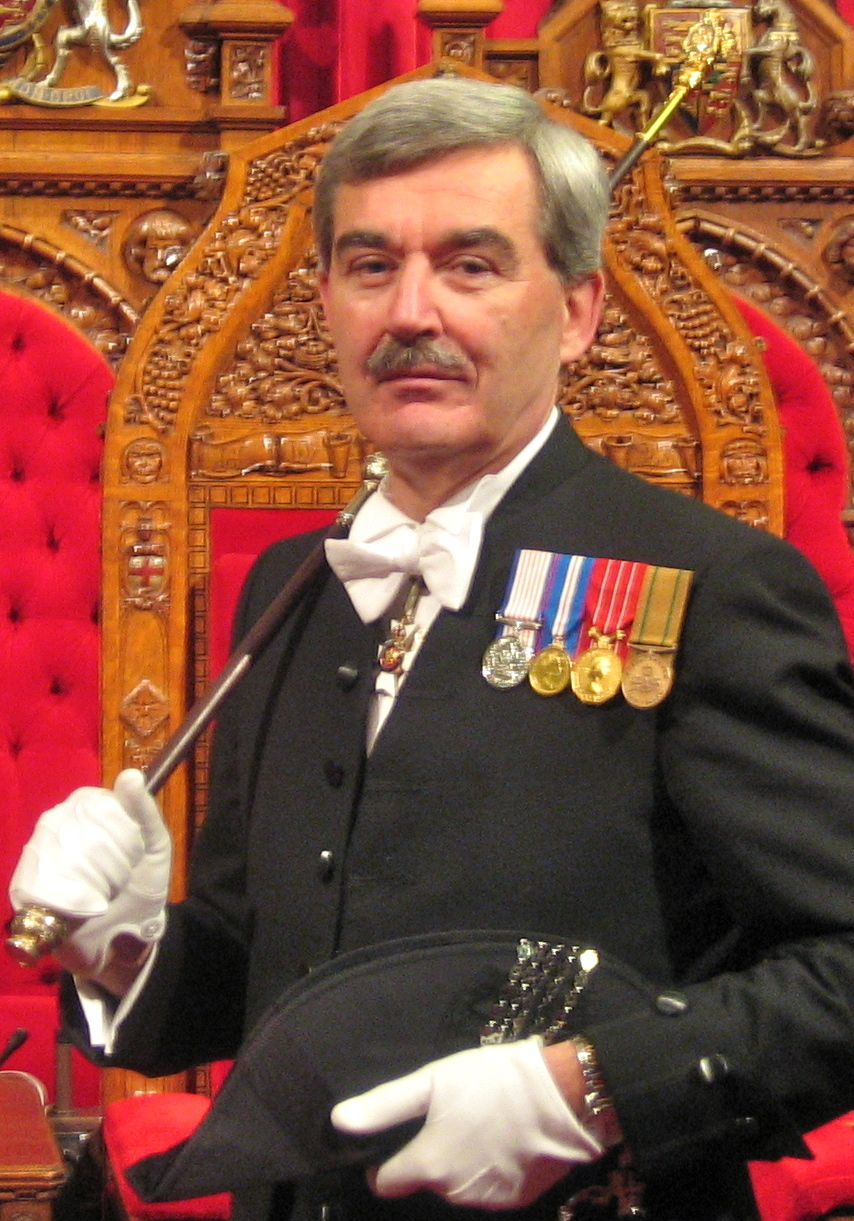
- Kevin S. MacLeod in the Canadian Senate Chamber

15th Usher of the Black Rod
- In office 26 May 2008 – 30 September 2013
- Monarch: Elizabeth II
- Governors General: Michaëlle Jean; David Johnston
- Prime Minister: Stephen Harper
- Preceded by: Terrance Christopher
- Succeeded by: J. Greg Peters

Canadian Secretary to The Queen
- In office April 1, 2009 – February 10, 2015
- Monarch: Elizabeth II
- Preceded by: Major General Maurice Gaston Cloutier
- Succeeded by: Donald Booth

Personal details
- Born: 1951 (age 74–75) North Sydney, Nova Scotia, Canada
- Occupation: Author, former Usher of the Black Rod, Secretary to the Queen

Kevin Stewart MacLeod CVO CD (born 1951) is a former Canadian Secretary to the Queen and former Usher of the Black Rod for the Canadian Senate.

Born in North Sydney, Nova Scotia, MacLeod studied at Boston University and Carleton University, where he received both his bachelor's degree in history and political science and a master's degree in international affairs, before moving on to the University of Burgundy in Dijon, France. After his return from there, MacLeod served for 10 years as an administrative assistant in the House of Commons of Canada, subsequently acting as a chief of staff for one of the then ministers of the Crown before being employed by the Department of Canadian Heritage for 22 years.

It is the responsibility of the Department of Canadian Heritage to organize royal tours of Canada, and it was for that in 1987 of Queen Elizabeth II that MacLeod first had a part in coordinating such an event. By the time of the Queen's 2005 visit to the prairies to celebrate the centennials of Alberta's and Saskatchewan's entry into Confederation, MacLeod was given the role of Acting Secretary to the Queen. For his service to the monarch, he had already been in 1992 appointed as a member of the Royal Victorian Order, and in 2002, the year of Elizabeth's Golden Jubilee, was promoted to the rank of lieutenant. But it was during the 2005 tour that MacLeod was elevated by the Queen in person to the highest position a Canadian can hold in the order (due to the government's adherence to the Nickle Resolution), that of commander; this made MacLeod the only Canadian to be promoted through all three levels of the order in Canada.

On March 27, 2008, MacLeod was appointed by order of the Governor-in-Council as the Usher of the Black Rod for the Senate, replacing Terrance Christopher.

On April 1, 2009, MacLeod was further appointed as the full-time Canadian Secretary to the Queen, putting him in charge of, amongst other things, coordinating royal tours of Canada by the Monarch and chairing the Diamond Jubilee Committee (to organize the celebrations in 2012 for the 60th anniversary of Queen Elizabeth II's accession as Queen of Canada). He was responsible for the visit of Prince Charles and the Duchess of Cornwall to Canada in November 2009, and he was responsible for co-ordinating the Queen's 24th official visit to Canada in 2010.

In 2010, MacLeod was appointed by the Prime Minister to the Governor General Consultation Committee, a special committee to recommend a successor to Governor General of Canada Michaëlle Jean. The panel recommended David Lloyd Johnston, who was installed as viceroy on October 1, 2010.

MacLeod retired from his post as the Usher in 2013. MacLeod retired from his post as Canadian Secretary to the Queen, and from the public service, on February 10, 2015.

MacLeod has written a historical fiction novel, A Stone on Their Cairn / Clach air An Càrn.

== Honours ==
Kevin S. MacLeod is entitled to the following medals.

Ribbon	Description	Notes
	Royal Victorian Order (CVO)	Member 1992 (MVO); Lieutenant 2002 (LVO); Commander 2005 (CVO)
	125th Anniversary of the Confederation of Canada Medal	1992
	Queen Elizabeth II Golden Jubilee Medal	2002 - Canadian Version of this Medal
	Queen Elizabeth II Diamond Jubilee Medal	2012 - Canadian Version of this Medal
	King Charles III Coronation Medal	
	Canadian Forces' Decoration	CD
	Commemorative Medal for the Centennial of Saskatchewan	2005
	Queen Elizabeth II Platinum Jubilee Medal	

Coat of arms of Kevin S. MacLeod
Crest Issuant from a coronet of maple leaves Or and thistles proper a Celtic cross Or; Escutcheon Per fess wavy Argent and Azure a bar wavy counterchanged, in chief two pommes each charged with a conifer tree issuant from a grassy mound Or, in base a triple-towered castle Argent; Supporters Two bulls Sable each gorged of a wreath of wood shavings and wheat heads Or, standing on a grassy mound Vert set with sweet peas and roses Or; Motto NAM BHRUADARAN CHÌ MI NA H-INNSE GALL (In dreams behold the Hebrides)

Court offices
Preceded by Maurice Gaston Cloutier	Canadian Secretary to the Queen; 1 April 2009 – 10 February 2015	Succeeded by Donald Booth
Parliament of Canada
Preceded by Terrance Christopher	Usher of the Black Rod; 26 May 2008 – 2013	Succeeded by J. Greg Peters
