= Advisory Committee on Vice-Regal Appointments =

Group advisor on royal representative appointments in Canada

The Advisory Committee on Vice-Regal Appointments was established on 4 November 2012 to assist the government of Canada (the Crown-in-Council) with the appointment of the governor general of Canada, provincial lieutenant governors, and territorial commissioners. The committee was disbanded following the defeat of the Conservative Party of Canada, led by Stephen Harper, in the 2015 federal election and remains "dormant" under Harper's successor as prime minister, Justin Trudeau.

== First iteration (Governor General Consultation Committee) ==
The Advisory Committee on Vice-Regal Appointments grew out of the ad hoc committee established in 2010 for the selection of a new governor general following the tenure of Michaëlle Jean. For the task, Prime Minister Stephen Harper convened a special search group—the Governor General Consultation Committee—which consisted of Sheila-Marie Cook, Secretary to the Governor General (the chairperson); Kevin MacLeod; Christopher Manfredi, dean of the Faculty of Arts at McGill University; Rainer Knopff, a political scientist at the University of Calgary; Jacques Monet; and Christopher McCreery, historian and private secretary to the Lieutenant Governor of Nova Scotia. The group, which was described as a "tight circle of monarchists," was instructed to submit a list of non-partisan candidates, each of whom would respect the monarchical aspects of the viceregal office. They conducted extensive consultations with more than 200 people across the country, including academics, provincial premiers, current and former political party leaders, former prime ministers, and others, in order to develop a short list of five candidates from which the Prime Minister would make the final selection.

== Second iteration (Committee on Vice-Regal Appointments) ==
The non-partisan Committee on Vice-Regal Appointments consisted of its chairperson—the Canadian Secretary to the Queen (most recently Kevin MacLeod)—as well as two permanent federal delegates, one Anglophone (most recently Robert Watt, citizenship judge and former Chief Herald of Canada) and one Francophone (most recently Jacques Monet, constitutional scholar and member of the Canadian Institute of Jesuit Studies); each served for a time not exceeding six years. For the appointment of a lieutenant governor or commissioner, two additional members drawn from the relevant province or territory would be temporarily added as members; each was a member for no longer than six months. A representative from the Office of the Prime Minister acted as an observer only.

Various other groups and individuals were consulted before the committee produced a shortlist of candidates; the recommendations were non-binding, as the appointment of the governor general remains the prerogative of the Canadian monarch acting on the advice of the prime minister of Canada, the appointment of the lieutenant governors the prerogative of the governor general acting on the advice of the prime minister of Canada, and the appointment of the commissioners the prerogative of the governor general acting on the advice of the minister of indigenous and northern affairs.

Harper later explained that he set up the committee and did not legislate it because he saw it as "only a first step to creating a much more formal selection process, beyond the sole judgment of the prime minister of the day." Writing this after the death of Queen Elizabeth II, Harper also stated, "I hope that, as King Charles III [...] takes the throne, there will be more discussion as to how he should be best represented in Canada and its provinces."

== Third iteration (Advisory Group on the Selection of the Next Governor General) ==
The 29th ministry, headed by Justin Trudeau, dissolved the Advisory Committee on Vice-Regal Appointments in 2017, before Trudeau selected Julie Payette to replace David Johnston as governor general. After reports of a toxic work environment in Rideau Hall during Payette's tenure, Trudeau was criticized for not thoroughly vetting Payette prior to her appointment and for not having used the advisory committee to find candidates.

Following Payette's resignation in January 2021, a six-member advisory panel—the Advisory Group on the Selection of the Next Governor General—was struck to seek out candidates for the vice-regal position and develop a shortlist of names to give the Prime Minister. This committee consisted of Minister of Intergovernmental Affairs Dominic LeBlanc, acting Clerk of the Privy Council Janice Charette, Inuit leader Natan Obed, Université de Montréal rector Daniel Jutras, interim Canada Post chair Suromitra Sanatani, and Judith A. LaRocque, a former secretary to the governor general. While the membership of the earlier consultation and advisory committees included those with interest in and connections to the viceregal office, the advisory group formed in 2021 was composed of members "selected for the diverse perspectives they bring to the work." This group was also the first to include a political representative from Cabinet.

The eventual selection of Mary Simon was informed through the advice of the advisory group.
