= Christopher McCreery =

Canadian historian (born 1975)

Christopher McCreery MVO FRCGS FRHSC
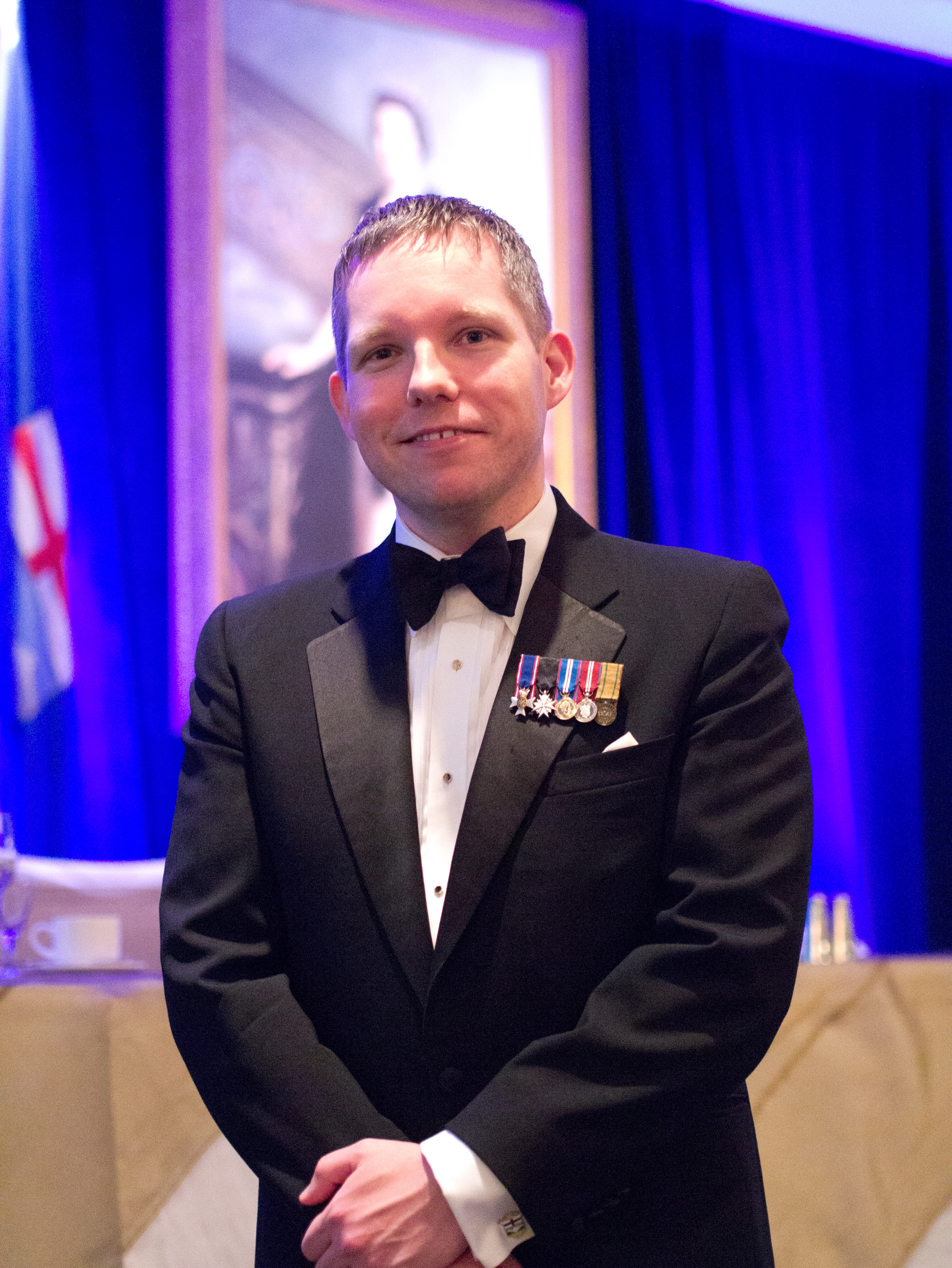
- McCreery in 2012
- Born: 1975 (age 50–51); Kingston, Ontario, Canada
- Occupation: Historian
- Notable work: The Order of Canada: Its Origins, History and Development (2005)
- Website: www.cpmccreery.com

Christopher McCreery (born 1975) is a Canadian historian known for his expertise in the area of orders, decorations, and medals, particularly in Canada and the Commonwealth. He has served as the Private Secretary to the Lieutenant Governor of Nova Scotia since 2009, and has authored several books on the history of national and provincial awards.

== Biography ==
Christopher McCreery was born in Kingston, Ontario, in 1975. He earned a Bachelor of Arts from Huron University College in 1998, and graduated with a PhD in Canadian political history from Queen's University at Kingston in 2003. After graduating, he served as Executive Assistant to the Canadian Senator Michael Kirby from 2004 to 2006. He became the Senior Policy Advisor to the Speaker of the Senate in 2006, a position he held for one year. McCreery has held the position of Private Secretary to the Lieutenant Governor of Nova Scotia since 2009, and in that capacity serves as Executive Director of Government House and Secretary of the Order of Nova Scotia.

McCreery is recognized for his expertise in the area of orders, decorations, and medals in the Commonwealth; he has authored several books on the subject. His 2005 book The Order of Canada: Its Origins, History and Development received an endorsement from Queen Elizabeth II. He is a Fellow of the Royal Canadian Geographical Society and has served as the National Historian for the St John Ambulance and the Order of Saint John.

== Publications ==
- — (2005). The Order of Canada: Its Origins, History and Development. Toronto: University of Toronto Press. ISBN 978-0-8020-3940-8.
- — (2005). The Canadian Honours System. Foreword by General John de Chastelain (1st ed.). Toronto: Dundurn Press. ISBN 978-1-5500-2554-5.
- — (2007). On Her Majesty's Service: Royal Honours and Recognition in Canada. Foreword by Anne, Princess Royal. Toronto: Dundurn Press. ISBN 978-1-5500-2742-6.
- — (2008). The Maple Leaf and the White Cross: A History of St. John Ambulance and the Most Venerable Order of the Hospital of St. John of Jerusalem in Canada. Foreword by Michaëlle Jean. Toronto: Dundurn Press. ISBN 978-1-5500-2740-2.
- — (2008). The Beginner's Guide to Canadian Honours. Foreword by Prince Edward, Earl of Wessex. Toronto: Dundurn Press. ISBN 978-1-5500-2748-8.
- —; Milnes, Arthur (2009). The Authentic Voice of Canada: R.B. Bennett Speeches in the House of Lords, 1941–1947. Foreword by John Turner. Montreal: McGill–Queen's University Press. ISBN 978-1-5533-9275-0.
- — (2010). The Canadian Forces' Decoration. Ottawa: Department of National Defence. OCLC 956655078.
- —; Pike, Corinna (2011). Canadian Symbols of Authority: Maces, Chains and Rods of Office. Forewords by Prince Andrew, Duke of York and Terrance Christopher. Toronto: Dundurn Press. ISBN 978-1-5548-8901-3.
- — (2012). The Order of Military Merit. Ottawa: Department of National Defence. ISBN 978-1-1002-0634-9.
- — (2012). Commemorative Medals of The Queen's Reign in Canada, 1952–2012. Toronto: Dundurn Press. ISBN 978-1-4597-0756-6.
- — (2014). Maintiens Le Droit: Recognizing Service: A History of the RCMP Long Service Medal. Ottawa: Royal Canadian Mounted Police.
- — (2014). Savoir Faire, Savoir Vivre: Rideau Club 1865–2015. Toronto: Dundurn Press. ISBN 978-1-4597-1756-5.
- — (2015). The Canadian Honours System. Foreword by General John de Chastelain (2nd ed.). Toronto: Dundurn Press. ISBN 978-1-4597-2415-0.
- — (2016). Fifty Years Honouring Canadians: The Order of Canada, 1967–2017. Foreword by Jean Vanier. Toronto: Dundurn Press. ISBN 978-1-4597-3657-3.
- — (2017). The Order of Canada: Genesis of an Honours System. Forewords by Queen Elizabeth II and David Johnston. Toronto: University of Toronto Press. ISBN 978-1-4875-0094-8.
- — (2020). Government House Halifax: A Place of History and Gathering. Foreword by Charles, Prince of Wales. Fredericton, N.B.: Goose Lane Editions. ISBN 978-1-7731-0201-6.
- —; Smith, David E.; Shanks, Jonathan (2022). Canada's Deep Crown: Beyond Elizabeth II, The Crown's Continuing Canadian Complexion. Toronto: University of Toronto Press. ISBN 978-1-4875-4075-3.

== Awards and honours ==
- Queen Elizabeth II Golden Jubilee Medal (2002)
- Member of the Royal Victorian Order (2010)
- Queen Elizabeth II Diamond Jubilee Medal (2012)
- Fellow of the Royal Heraldry Society of Canada (2013)
- King Charles III Coronation Medal (2025)
