= 1st Infantry Division Commanding General's Mounted Color Guard =

1st Infantry Division Commanding General’s Mounted Color Guard
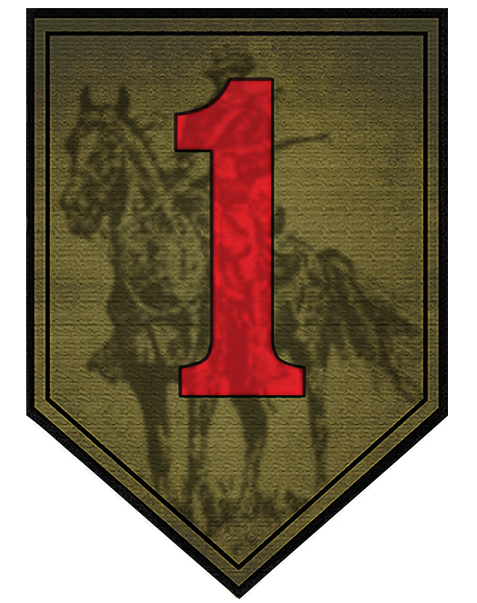
- Active: 1992-present
- Country: United States
- Allegiance: 1st Infantry Division
- Branch: US Army
- Type: Ceremonial Equestrian Unit
- Garrison/HQ: Fort Riley, Kansas
- Website: https://www.facebook.com/RileyCGMCG

Commanders
- Current commander: CPT Patrick W. Gurnow
- First Sergeant: 1st Sgt. Edward Lindey

The Commanding General's Mounted Color Guard (CGMCG) is an equestrian unit of the United States Army at Fort Riley, Kansas and is a subordinate unit of the 1st Infantry Division. Formed in 1992, the CGMCG is a link to Fort Riley's history as a frontier fort on the Oregon Trail and the site of the U.S. Army Cavalry School.

== Uniforms and equipment ==
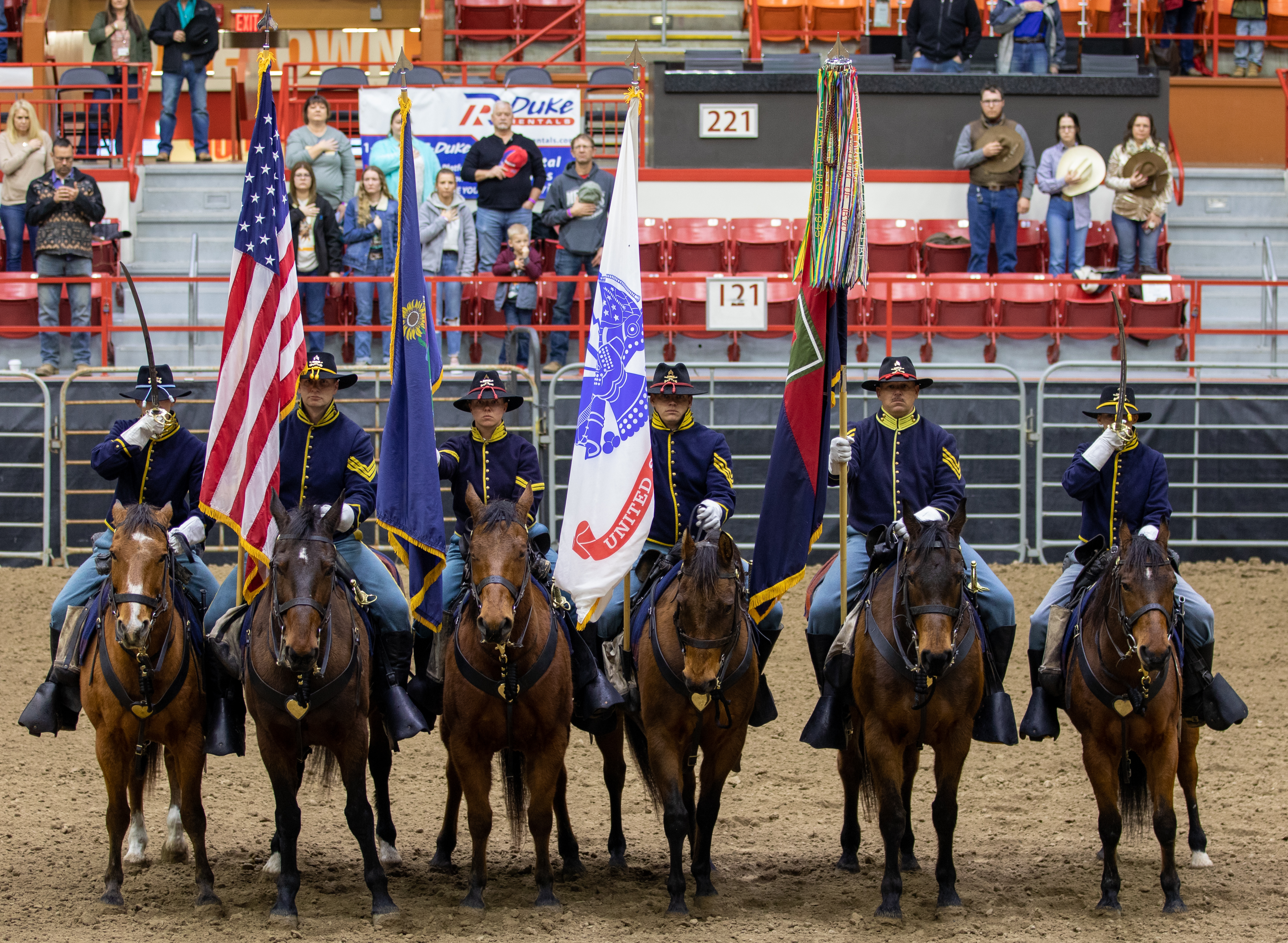
The CGMCG posts the colors wearing their traditional cavalry uniforms during Equifest for the National Anthem in Salina, KS on March 18, 2022

The CGMCG wear the uniforms of Civil War era cavalry soldiers as described in Army manuals from the period. This uniform is a wool/cotton blend in kersey blue for the trousers with a yellow (cavalry) stripe. They wear slouch or campaign hats and black knee-high riding boots.

The troopers use a variety of firearms including the 1858 .44-caliber Remington New-Model Revolver, the 1873 .45-caliber Remington Lever-Action Repeater Rifle and the 1873 12-gauge double-barrel shotgun. Troopers might also carry the Model 1861 Light Cavalry Saber.

== Horses and mules ==
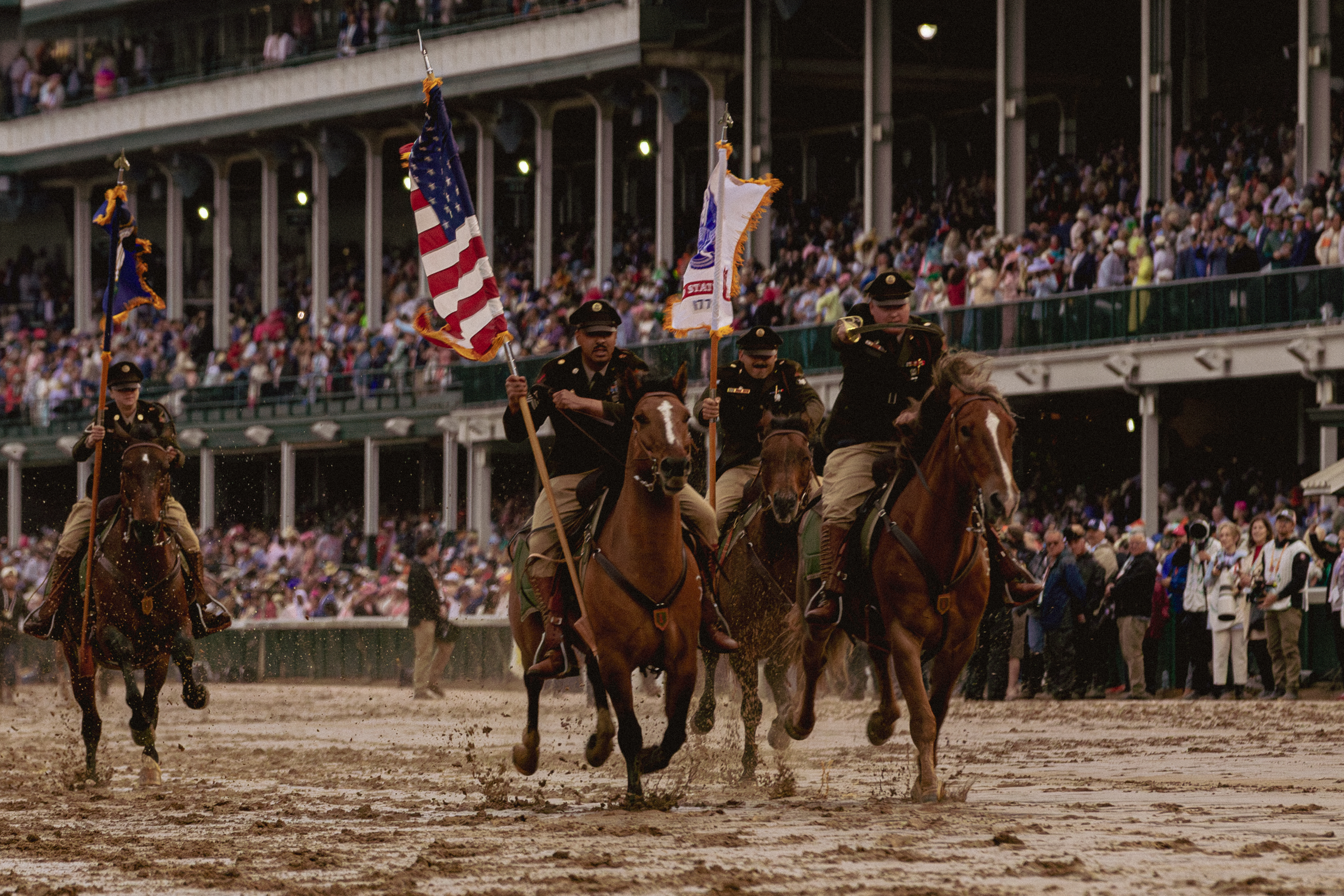
U.S. Army Pfc. Alyssa Demers, Sgt. Dakota Marrs, Spc. Ryan Frias, and Spc. Tyler Boyer, of the CGMCG, charge off the field after performing the Passing of the Colors during the Kentucky Derby, on May 3, 2025

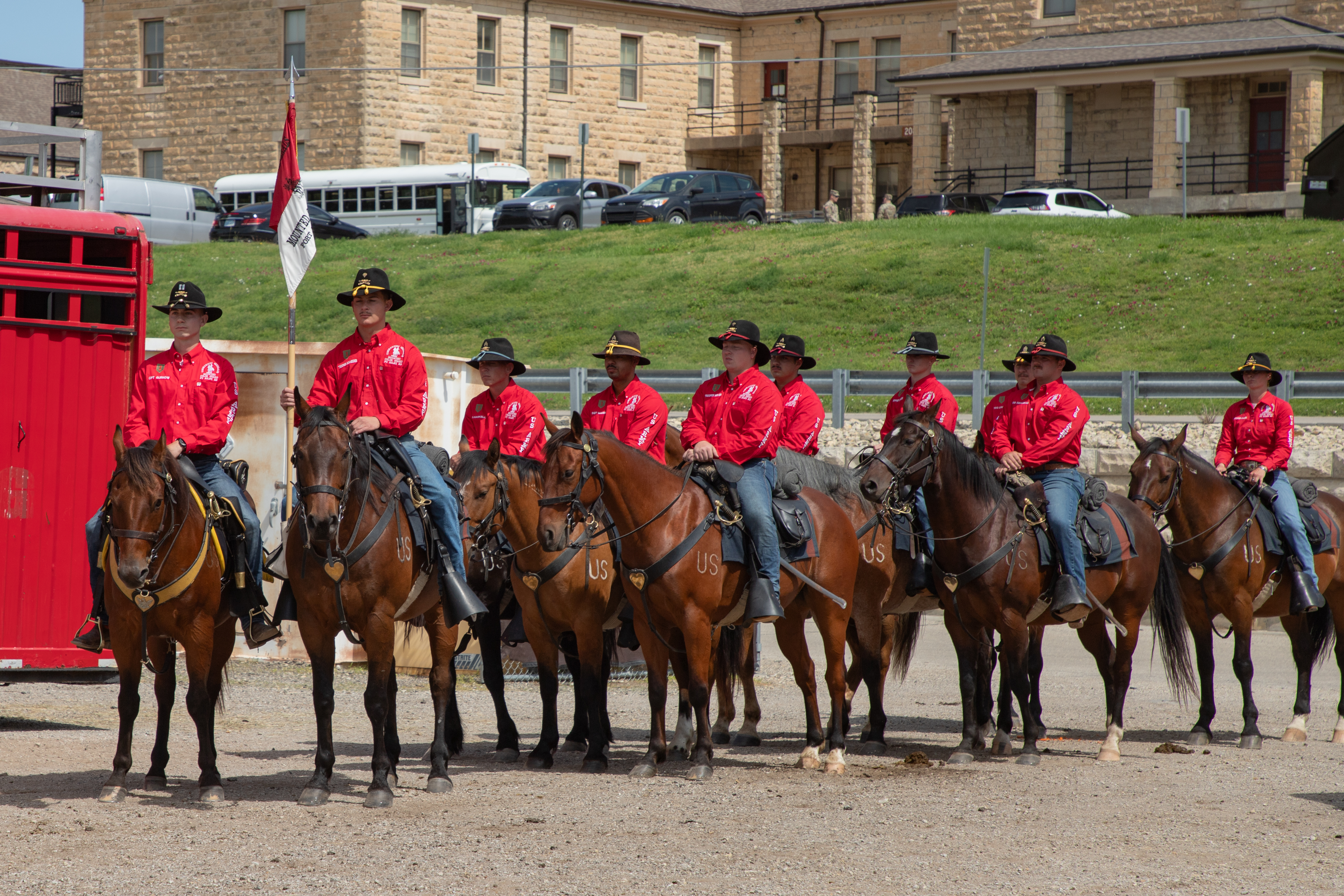
The 1st Infantry Division's Commanding General's Mounted Color Guard, change of command ceremony on Fort Riley, KS, May 29, 2024

The CGMCG uses dark black, bay or brown geldings with few or no white points - as did the frontier cavalry because they would blend in and not be visible to the enemy.

They also have two Belgian Cross Molly Mules that haul their 1871 Escort Wagon that was rebuilt in 2001 using the original metal hardware with new wood.

== Kentucky Derby ==
As a part of the celebration of the 250th anniversary of the founding of the U.S. Army, the CGMCG performed at the presentation of the colors at the Kentucky Derby May 3, 2025.

== Temporary deactivation ==
On 2 July 2025, the Army announced that the Military Working Equid (MWE) program that includes the CGMCG would cease operations and associated assets will be transferred, adopted, or donated within one year. The Army stated, "This initiative will save the Army $2 million annually and will allow the funds and soldiers dedicated to MWE programs to be redirected to readiness and warfighting priorities." In December, the Army announced that this Military Working Equid program will remain active along with the one at Fort Hood.

The Army also announced the creation of the 08H Army Equestrian MOS for enlisted soldiers in grades E5-E9 for soldiers at Fort Hood, Fort Riley and the Old Guard.

== Featured performances ==
- St. Patrick's Day Parade - St. Louis, Missouri 2026
- Trail To Zero ride - New York City 2026

== See also ==
- Old Guard Caisson Platoon
- 1st Cavalry Division Horse Cavalry Detachment
