= Musical Ride =

Equestrian event performed by the Royal Canadian Mounted Police

- Le Carrousel (French)
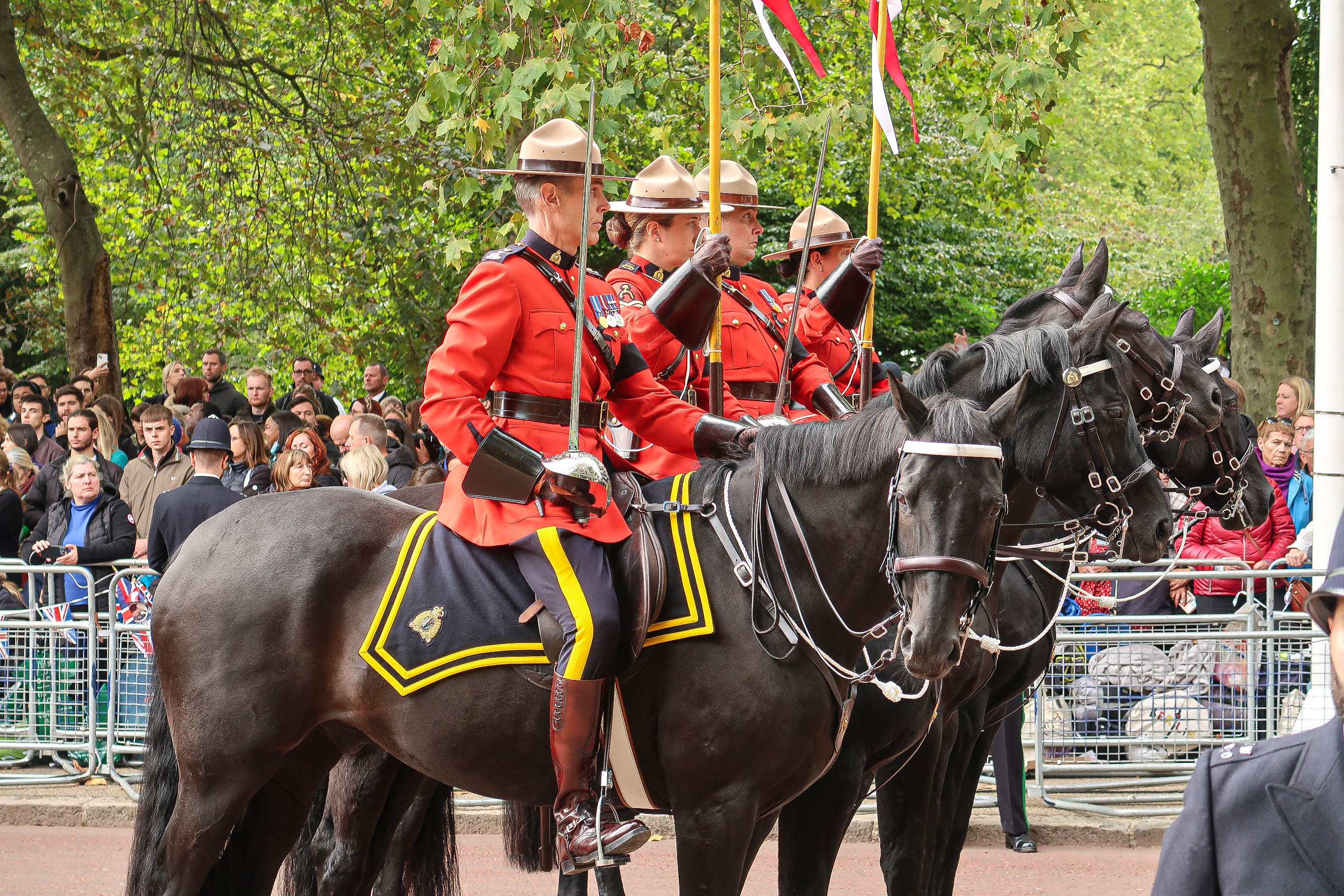
- Members of the Musical Ride during the State Funeral of Queen Elizabeth II
- Nickname: Mounties
- Formation: 1887
- Type: Cavalry
- Headquarters: RCMP Stables (Musical Ride Centre), Ottawa, Ontario
- Location: Canada
- Parent organization: Royal Canadian Mounted Police
- Volunteers: 32 riders
- Website: rcmp-grc.gc.ca/en/musical-ride

The Musical Ride of the Royal Canadian Mounted Police is a special unit showcasing the equestrian skills performed by 32 cavalry who are regular members of the force. It holds events in Canada and worldwide to promote the RCMP. The first official ride was held in 1887 in Regina, District of Assiniboia, and was commanded by Inspector William George Matthews.

== History ==
In the 1920s and 1930s, there were two cavalry units, one in Regina and one in Ottawa.

The activities of the Musical Ride temporarily ceased in 1939, because of the Second World War and did not resume until 1948.

In 1966, riding on horseback ceased to be part of police duties for new members of the RCMP. The unit then moved to Pakenham, Ontario in 1968 and became a separate unit.

The RCMP and the Musical Ride were all men at its foundation. The first woman was incorporated to the Ride in 1981.

During its annual tour of Canada and abroad, usually from May to October, the Musical Ride visits 40 to 50 locations. Domestically, it is found every 1 July in Ottawa on Canada Day and has performed at the Expo 67, the 1976 Olympic Games in Montreal, the 1988 Winter Olympics in Calgary, and the 2010 Winter Olympics in Vancouver.

In 2020, as the result of the COVID-19 pandemic, the Musical Ride first held an on-line GC Surplus auction of its surplus horses and horse semen. In former years, the biennial auction process was more tightly controlled.

== Traditions ==
=== Commissioner’s inspection ===
Every spring, the RCMP Commissioner visits the Musical Ride stables before its summer tour in what is known as the Commissioner's Inspection. It dates back to 22 July 1952, when Commissioner Leonard Nicholson carried out the first inspection at what is now the Musical Ride Centre. The Commissioner then watches the first official performance of the season, before taking the salute in a march past that commences the tour.

=== Landau ===
The RCMP operates four carriages for escorting guests of the state, the most senior being the Canadian State Landau, used only for the Canadian royal family, the Governor General of Canada or a foreign head of state. It was gifted by the Earl Grey to the RCMP in 1911 and has been operated by the Musical Ride ever since. The other three carriages are used for semi-state occasions (an example being an ambassador visit) are the following: the Box Driven Landau, Vis-à-vis and Victoria. In the summer of 2020, the Musical Ride received a gift of a landau from a donor from Quebec City, which is used today by the Musical Ride for state escorts.

If the escort is in place for the sovereign, a total of 44 horses and a guidon party ride with the State Landau. By contrast, a semi-state escort would include only eight horses.

== Notable members ==
- J. Greg Peters, 16th Usher of the Black Rod of the Senate of Canada

== Within contemporary culture ==
The Musical Ride is featured on the Canadian fifty-dollar bill of the Scenes of Canada banknote series produced from 1969 to 1979.

A fictionalized version of the Musical Ride is depicted on Canadian police procedural TV series Due South (season 2, episode 14, "All the Queen's Horses", first broadcast in 1997).

=== Musical Rides across Canada ===
In Canada, due to the impact of the unit has had in preserving Canadian military cavalry traditions, the "musical ride" can also refer to similar mounted units in the Canadian Army such as the Strathcona Ceremonial Mounted Troop, Governor General's Horse Guards Cavalry Squadron and the Royal Canadian Dragoons Scarlet Guard.

== Gallery ==
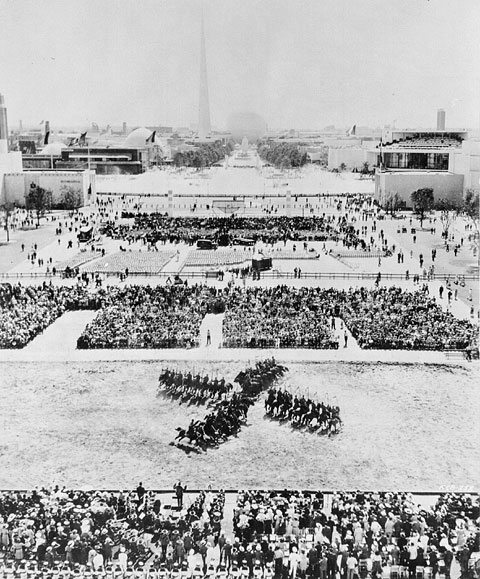
RCMP horsemen performing at the 1939 World's Fair

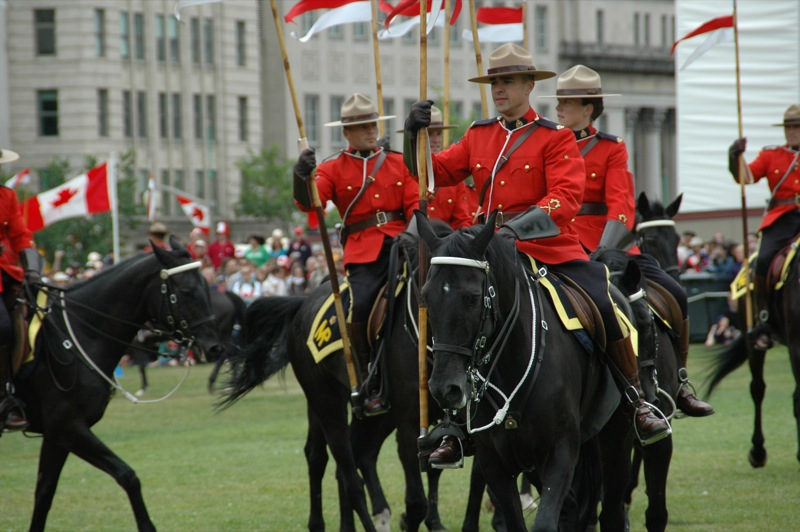
The Musical Ride performed on Parliament Hill in Ottawa, Canada Day, 2007

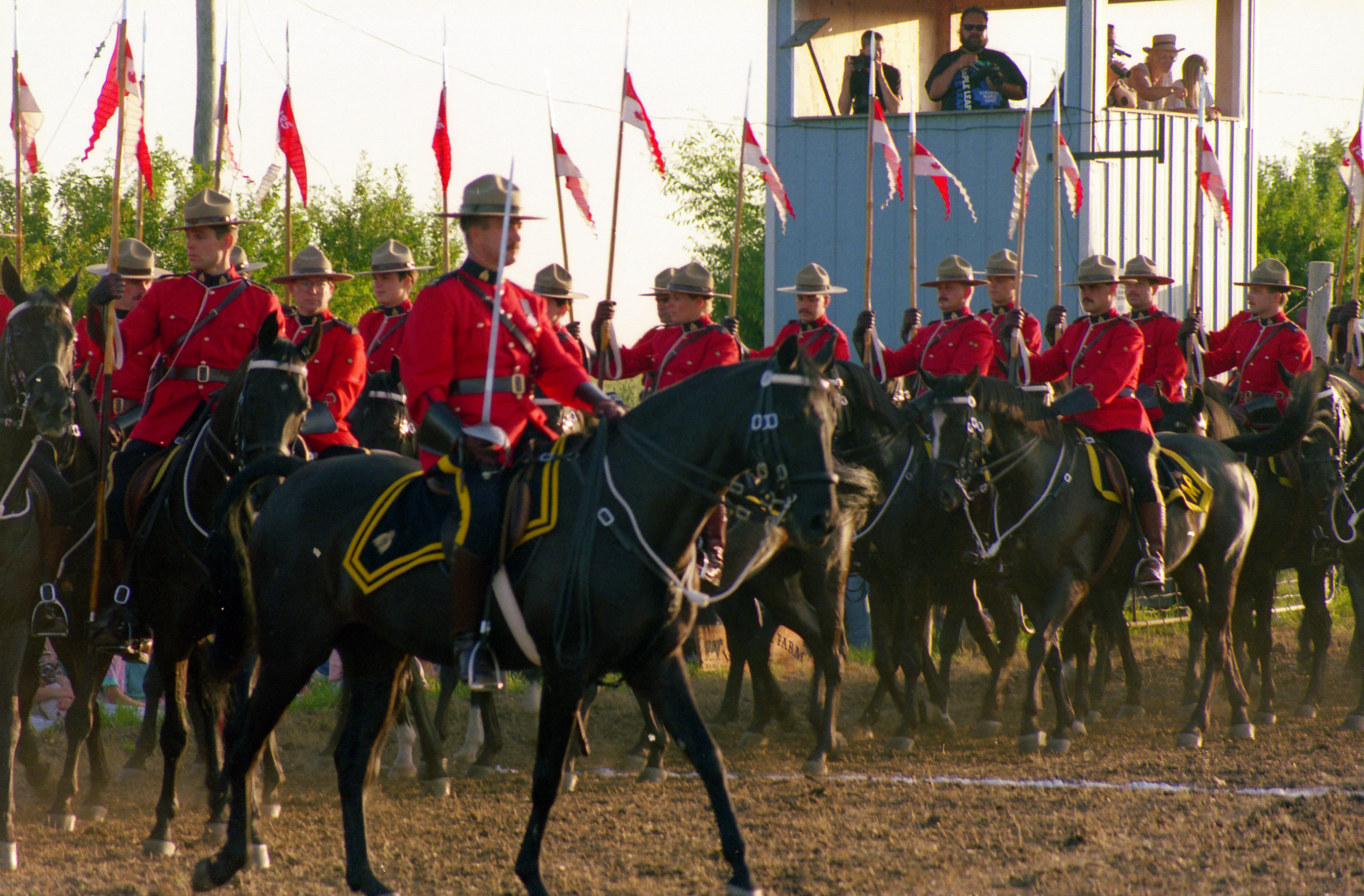
Musical Ride parade in Roblin, Manitoba, 1992

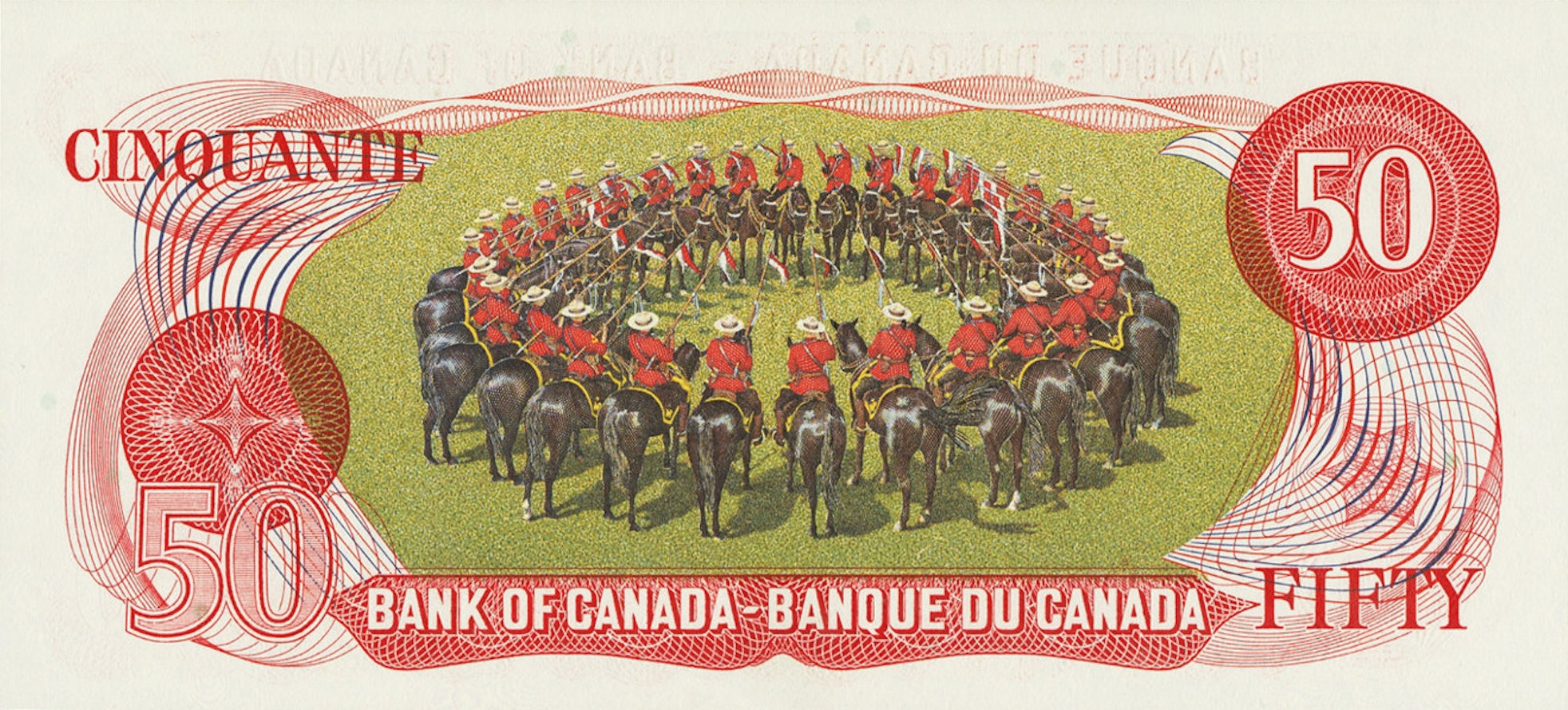
Dome formation of the Musical ride on the Scenes of Canada $50 note, 1975

== See also ==
- Strathcona Ceremonial Mounted Troop
- 1st Cavalry Division Horse Cavalry Detachment
