= Canadian Secretary to the King =

Senior position in the royal household of the monarch of Canada

- Secrétaire canadien du Roi
- Privy Council Office
- Formation: 1959
- First holder: Howard Graham

The Canadian secretary to the king (French: Secrétaire canadien du Roi) is the senior operational member of the royal household for the monarch of Canada, presently King Charles III. The office was established as Canadian secretary to the queen in 1959. The present office holder is Donald Booth, who was appointed to the position in 2019.

== Purpose ==
The secretary is the principal channel of communication between the monarch and his Canadian government and provincial governments, as well as managing the monarch's other correspondence in the Canadian context and drafting speeches the king delivers in Canada or on Canadian topics. They are responsible for advising the prime minister "on matters related to the Canadian Crown, including providing advice on the government of Canada's heritage-related commemorative initiatives [...] and state ceremonial and protocol advisory functions," such as royal jubilees.

The secretary is also responsible for the programme of tours of Canada by members of the royal family and the coordination between Rideau Hall, federal government departments, provincial governments, the Royal Canadian Mounted Police, and the Canadian Armed Forces. The secretary also arranges for members of the royal family to be patrons of Canadian organizations, either civil or military. The secretary formerly chaired, ex-officio, the Advisory Committee on Vice-Regal Appointments, before it was disbanded in 2015.

== History ==
The post was created in 1959 and was deliberately made separate from the governor general's staff; though, it had ties to Rideau Hall and complemented the viceregal household. The secretary acted as the Canadian adviser to the monarch and coordinator of tours of Canada by members of the royal family. He was thus appointed on an ad hoc basis until 1998, when the secretary would serve for an indeterminate length of time and, until 2005, was always the sergeant-at-arms of the House of Commons. From 2005 to 2009, the office remained vacant until Prime Minister Stephen Harper appointed the Usher of the Black Rod to the position.

In 2012, Harper made the office a standalone position with a mandate to "advise the prime minister on matters relating to the Canadian Crown." The role was also expanded, with the secretary chairing the Advisory Committee on Vice-Regal Appointments.

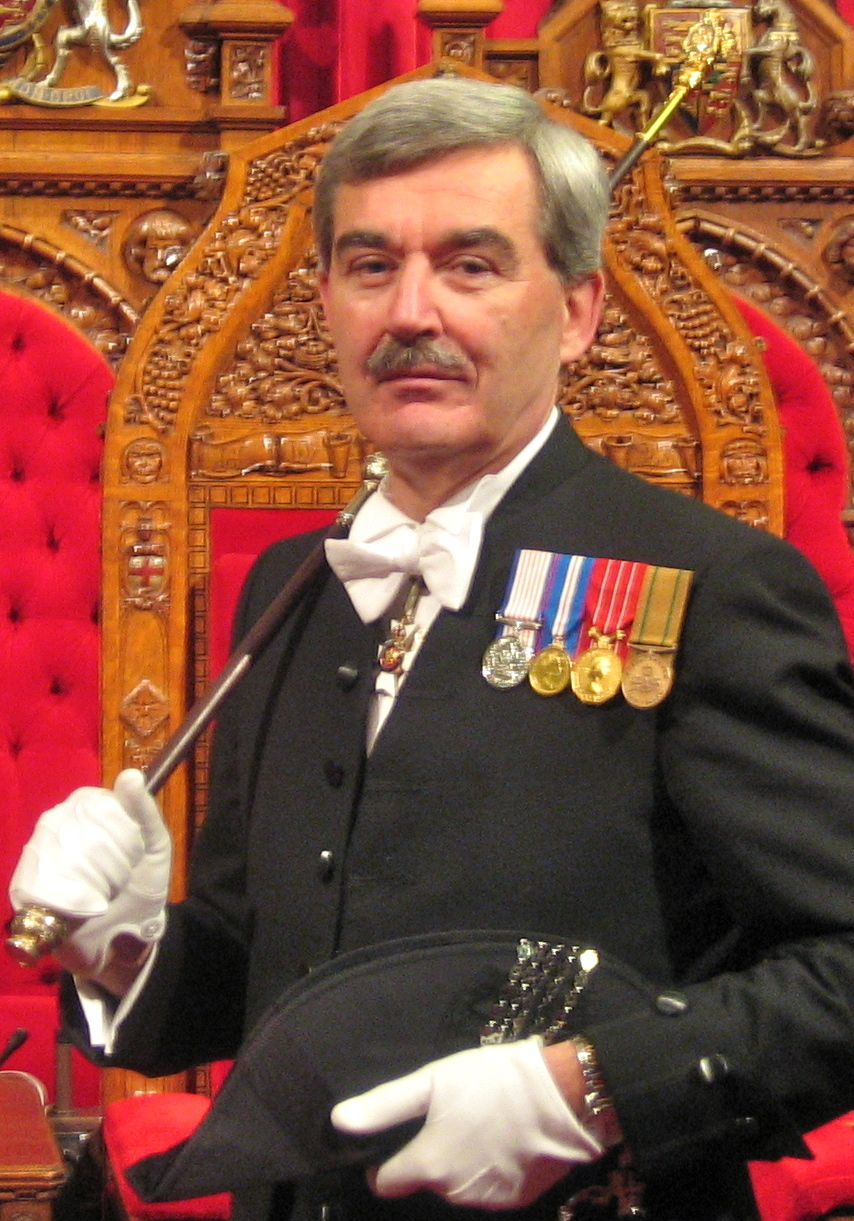
Kevin S. MacLeod, the Canadian Secretary to the Queen from 2009 to 2017

In November 2015, responsibility for the Canadian secretary to the queen was transferred from the Privy Council Office to the minister of Canadian heritage, at the time Pablo Rodríguez. As a result, the office no longer reported directly to the prime minister. The roles and responsibilities formerly exercised by the office were assumed by the Department of Canadian Heritage from 2015 to 2019. The Advisory Committee on Vice-Regal Appointments was disbanded when Justin Trudeau was appointed prime minister in 2015 and remains "dormant".

After remaining vacant for nearly three years, the position was filled in 2019 by Donald Booth, a federal civil servant who concurrently holds the position as director of the strategic policy in the Machinery of Government branch of the Privy Council Office. In the same year, the responsibility for the Canadian secretary to the queen was transferred back to the Privy Council Office.

== List of Canadian secretaries to the monarch ==
Before 2012, the role was mainly for the duration of a royal tour of Canada.

Name	Tenure	Notes	Monarch (Reign)
H.F. Fever and Charles Stein	1957	Both were not formally serving in the role, but coordinated the 1957 Elizabeth II's royal tour to Ottawa. Both were employed by the Civil Service of Canada.	Elizabeth II (1952–2022)
Lieutenant General Howard Graham	1959; 1967	Served during the 1959 and 1967 royal tours.	Elizabeth II (1952–2022)
Christopher Campbell Eberts	1964	Served during the 1964 royal tour to PEI, Quebec and Ottawa. Canadian diplomat.	Elizabeth II (1952–2022)
Brigadier General Perry Stewart Cooper	1970–1973	Served during the 1970 tour of the Northwest Territories and Manitoba; the 1971 tour of British Columbia; and the 1973 tour of Alberta, Ontario as well as Ottawa for the Commonwealth Heads of Government Meeting (CHOGM), Prince Edward Island, and Saskatchewan. Gazetted 28 November 1970 (1970–1972) and Gazetted 13 January 1973.	Elizabeth II (1952–2022)
Michel Gauvin	1975–1977	Served during the 1976 tour of Nova Scotia, New Brunswick, and Quebec (including the 1976 Summer Olympics); and the 1977 royal tour of the National Capital Region during the Silver Jubilee of Elizabeth II. Gazetted 6 December 1975 and 4 June 1977. Retired Major and diplomat.	Elizabeth II (1952–2022)
Henry F. Davis	1978–1982	Served during the 1978 royal tour of Newfoundland, Saskatchewan, and Alberta; and the 1982 royal tour to the National Capital Region for the proclamation of the Constitution Act, 1982. Gazetted on 4 March 1978.	Elizabeth II (1952–2022)
Lieutenant Commander Lawrence James Wallace	1983	Served during the 1983 royal tour to British Columbia. Gazetted on 8 January 1983.	Elizabeth II (1952–2022)
Major General Roland Antoine Reid	1984	Served during the 1984 royal tour to New Brunswick, Ontario and Manitoba. Gazetted 21 January 1984.	Elizabeth II (1952–2022)
Léon Balcer	1987	Served during the 1987 tour of British Columbia (for a CHOGM), Saskatchewan, Quebec. Did not complete tour due to ill health. Order-in-Council (OIC) 1987–1988.	Elizabeth II (1952–2022)
John Crosbie Perlin	1989–1991	Tour of Alberta and Ottawa for Canada Day, 1990. OIC 1990-0292.	Elizabeth II (1952–2022)
Rick Hansen	1992	Served during the 1992 royal to Ottawa for the 125 anniversary of Canada. Did not complete tour due to a fall. OIC 1992-0280.	Elizabeth II (1952–2022)
Major General Maurice Gaston Cloutier	1994–2005	Royal Tours of 1994, 1997, 2002, 2005 OICs 1995-0191, 1996-1688, 1998-0510.	Elizabeth II (1952–2022)
Kevin S. MacLeod	2009–2017	Royal Tour of 2010. OICs 2009-0493, 2010-1634, 2012-1481, 2015-0125.	Elizabeth II (1952–2022)
Donald Booth	2019–2022	Public servant with the Privy Council Office.	Elizabeth II (1952–2022)
Donald Booth	2022–2026	Public servant with the Privy Council Office.	Charles III (2022–present)

== See also ==
- Principal Secretary (Canada)
- Private Secretary to the Sovereign
- Secretary to the Governor General of Canada
