= George Hunter (photographer) =

Canadian photographer (1921–2013)

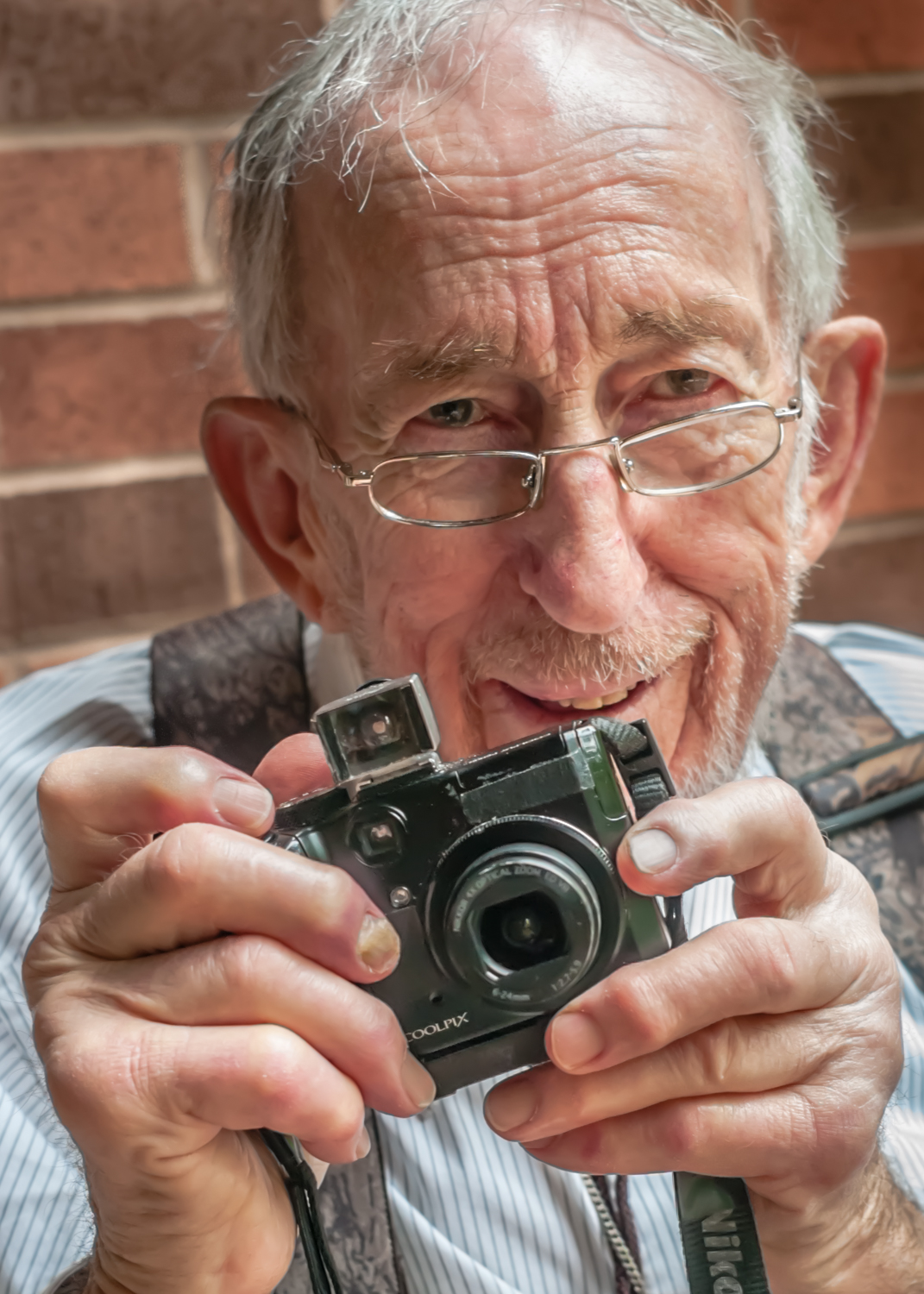
- George Hunter at his home in Mississauga, Ontario, on 22 May 2009.
- Born: 1921; Regina, Saskatchewan
- Died: 10 April 2013 (aged 92); Mississauga, Ontario
- Known for: photographer

George Hunter RCA (1921 – 10 April 2013) was a Canadian documentary photographer born in Regina, Saskatchewan. His career spanned seven decades capturing industrial and landscape scenes on photographic film. His early work was for the National Film Board of Canada in the 1940s. He was a pilot, and aerial photography was one of his specialties. His work included a 12-page cover story for Time Magazine in 1954. Other prominent uses of his work included being the basis of images printed by the Bank of Canada for three of its early 1970s bank notes. One of his photographs is contained on the Voyager Golden Record carried on the Voyager 1 and 2 interstellar space probes. He spent his final years living in Mississauga, Ontario, where he died in 2013.

== Career ==
He was born in Regina, Saskatchewan, and started taking photographs professionally for the newspapers like the Winnipeg Tribune. He worked for the Tribune during World War II. He also worked for the National Film Board of Canada (NFB) in the 1940s. After the war, he turned to freelance work. One of his main stylistic features is the use of aerial photography, since he was also an airplane pilot.

His most high-profile work appeared in Time magazine in the mid-1950s, when his work on American landscapes, photographed at dusk were highlighted in the 20 September 1954 issue's 12-page article entitled "The U.S. After Dark". His work is represented in collections nationwide, including more than one hundred works at the Canadian Museum of Contemporary Photography.

== Honours ==
=== 1970s Canadian banknote series ===
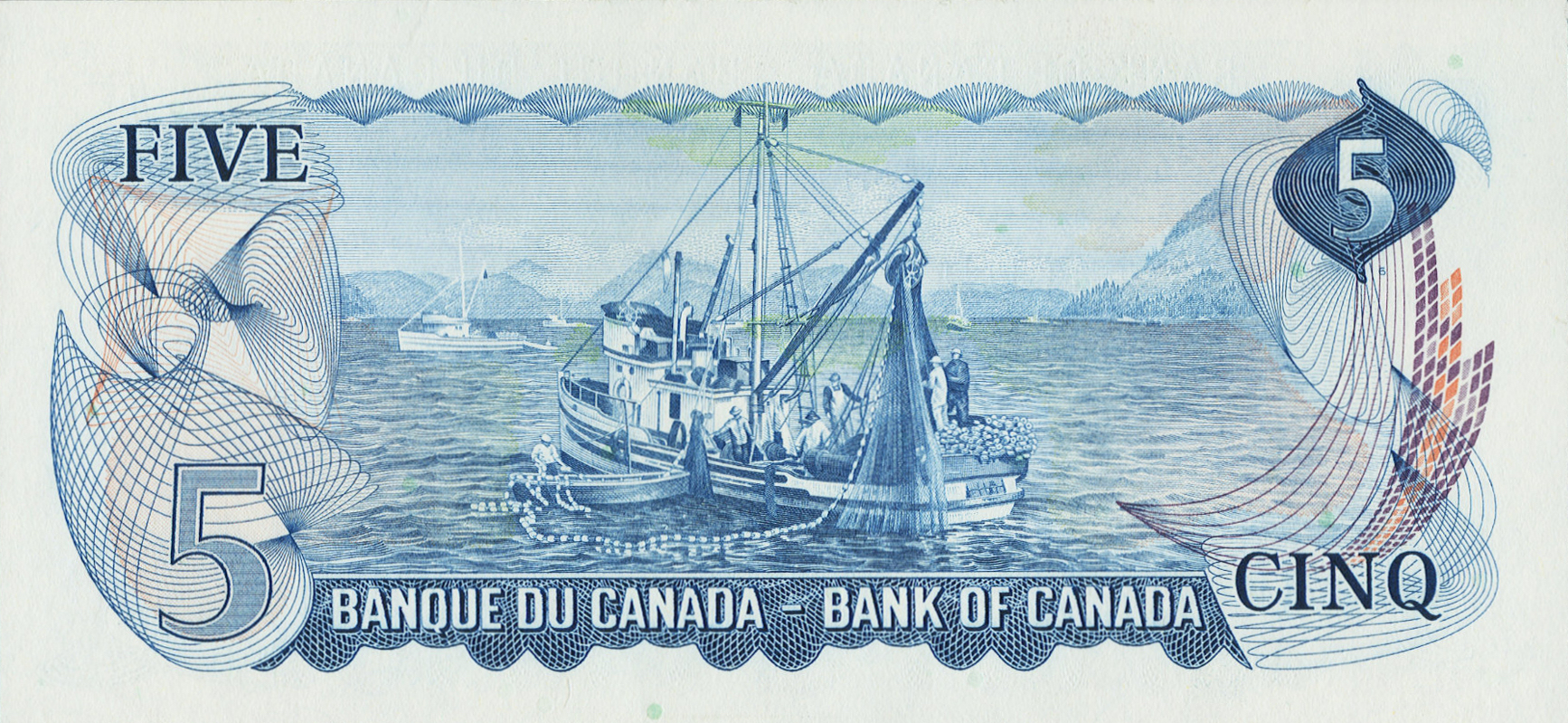
Engraving of George Hunter photograph on the back side of the Scenes of Canada $5 note, issued in 1972

Three of his images were used by the Bank of Canada for use in their early 1970 Scenes of Canada, or “Multicoloured,” series, which included the designs of the five, ten, and fifty dollar bills. His image of the BCP45 seine fishing boat was on the cover of the Toronto Star's weekend magazine, The Weekly Star, in 1958. The image showed indigenous fishers setting up their seine net to catch salmon in British Columbia's Johnstone Strait. The Bank of Canada bought the rights to the photo and now controls the image.

=== Other honours ===
He was one of the first photographers to be accepted into the Royal Canadian Academy of Arts and is a founding member of the Canadian Heritage Photography Foundation. One of his photographs – of Toronto's Pearson International Airport – was included on the Voyager Golden Record carried on the Voyager 1 and 2 interstellar space probes. The Canadian Association of Photographers and Illustrators gave him a lifetime achievement award in 2001.

== Public collections ==
The Rooms Provincial Art Gallery, Art Gallery of Nova Scotia, Sherman Hines Photography Museum, New Brunswick Museum, Confederation Centre Art Gallery, Canadian Centre of Architecture, McCord Museum, Montreal Museum of Fine Art, Montreal Historic Centre, Canadian Museum of Civilization, North Shore Regional Museum, Canadian Museum of Contemporary Photography, Library and Archives Canada, Portrait Gallery of Canada, Art Gallery of Ontario, Robarts Library (University of Toronto), Mississauga Art Gallery, Manitoba Museum (HBC Collection), Winnipeg Art Gallery, Moose Jaw Museum and Art Gallery, Whyte Museum of the Rockies, Atlas Coal Mines National Historic Park, Vancouver Art Gallery, Art Gallery of Greater Victoria, Royal British Columbia Museum, Maritime Heritage Centre, N.W.T. Mining Heritage Society, Prince of Wales Northern Heritage Centre, MacBride Museum, Barbados Museum and Historical Society, Workers Arts and Heritage Centre.

== Legacy ==
Hunter lived his later years in Mississauga, Ontario, in home that served also as his studio. He died in Mississauga at age 92 on 10 April 2013 at the Credit Valley Hospital. In May 2017, the NFB and Canadian publisher Firefly Books announced that a selection of Hunter's work would be published in book form as George Hunter's Canada: Iconic Images from Canada's Most Prolific Photographer.
