= Ernest J. Chambers =

Canadian journalist and historian (1862–1925)

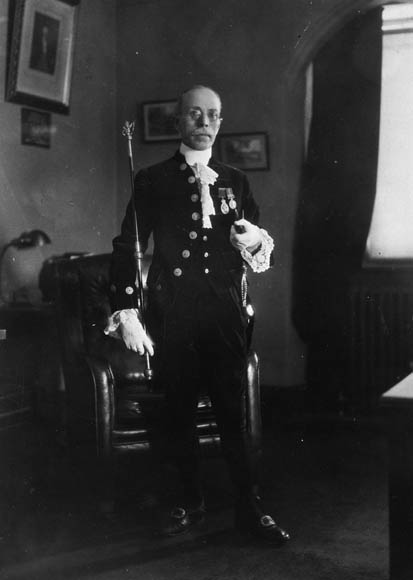
- Born: Ernest John Chambers; April 16, 1862; Penkridge, England
- Died: May 11, 1925 (aged 63); Vaudreuil, Quebec
- Occupations: Journalist, historian
- Spouse: Bertha Macmillan (m. 1898)
- Writing career
- Period: 20th century
- Genre: History

Ernest John Chambers (16 April 1862 – 11 May 1925) was a Canadian militia officer, journalist, author, and civil servant.

== Biography ==
Chambers was born in Penkridge, England. He and his family moved to Montreal in 1870 where his father became headmaster of a British-Canadian school. He studied at Prince Albert School in Saint-Henri and the High School of Montreal. He was Captain of the Montreal High School Cadet Rifles. After graduation, he became a journalist with the Montreal Daily Star, where he covered the Frederick Dobson Middleton and the North-West Rebellion of the Métis people.

From 1904–1925, he served as Gentleman Usher of the Black Rod, the most senior protocol position in the Parliament of Canada. In that role, he was the chief press censor of material during World War I where he censored passages that he perceived to be against the war effort including pacifist and socialist writings. His censorship efforts reflected a strong English-Canadian nationalism and tried to ban foreign language newspapers. After the war ended he continued in the position and with an increased mandate continued to censor material that had nothing to do with the war. During the Winnipeg General Strike in 1919, he banned the Yiddish journal Volkstimme which supported the strikers.

He died in Vaudreuil, Quebec in 1925 at the age of 63.

== Works ==
- The Queen's Own Rifles Of Canada, (1901)
- The Montreal Highland Cadets, (1901)
- The Governor General's Bodyguard, (1902)
- The Duke of Cornwall’s Own Rifles, (1903)
- The Book Of Montreal:...Canada's Commercial Metropolis, (1903)
- The 5th Regiment, Royal Scots of Canada Highlanders, (1904)
- The Royal North-West Mounted Police: A Corps History, (1906)
- The Unexploited West, (1914)
