= Strathcona Ceremonial Mounted Troop =

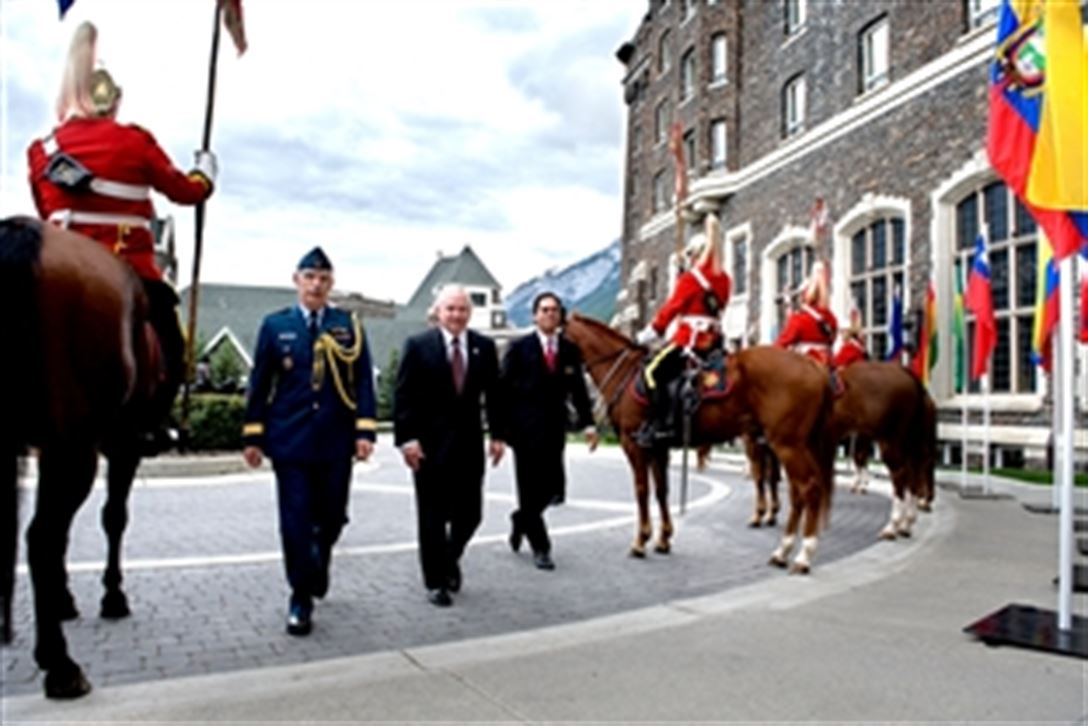
- Members of the troop providing a guard of honour for US Defence Secretary Robert Gates in Banff.
- Active: 1974–present
- Country: Canada
- Branch: Canadian Army
- Type: Ceremonial horse cavalry
- Role: Public duties
- Size: 1 troop composed of 27 soldiers, 1 officer, and 20 horses
- LdSH(RC) Regimental HQ: Edmonton, Alberta
- Motto: Perseverance
- March: "Soldiers of the Queen"
- Website: strathconas.ca/strathcona-mounted-troop

Commanders
- Troop Leader: Capt Chelsea Stephen
- Troop Warrant Officer: Sgt Gregory Dobson

The Strathcona Ceremonial Mounted Troop is a ceremonial mounted cavalry unit of the Canadian Army, attached to Lord Strathcona's Horse (Royal Canadians), an armoured regiment based in Edmonton, Alberta. It is one of two military mounted troops in Canada. The other belongs to the Governor General's Horse Guards

== Overview ==
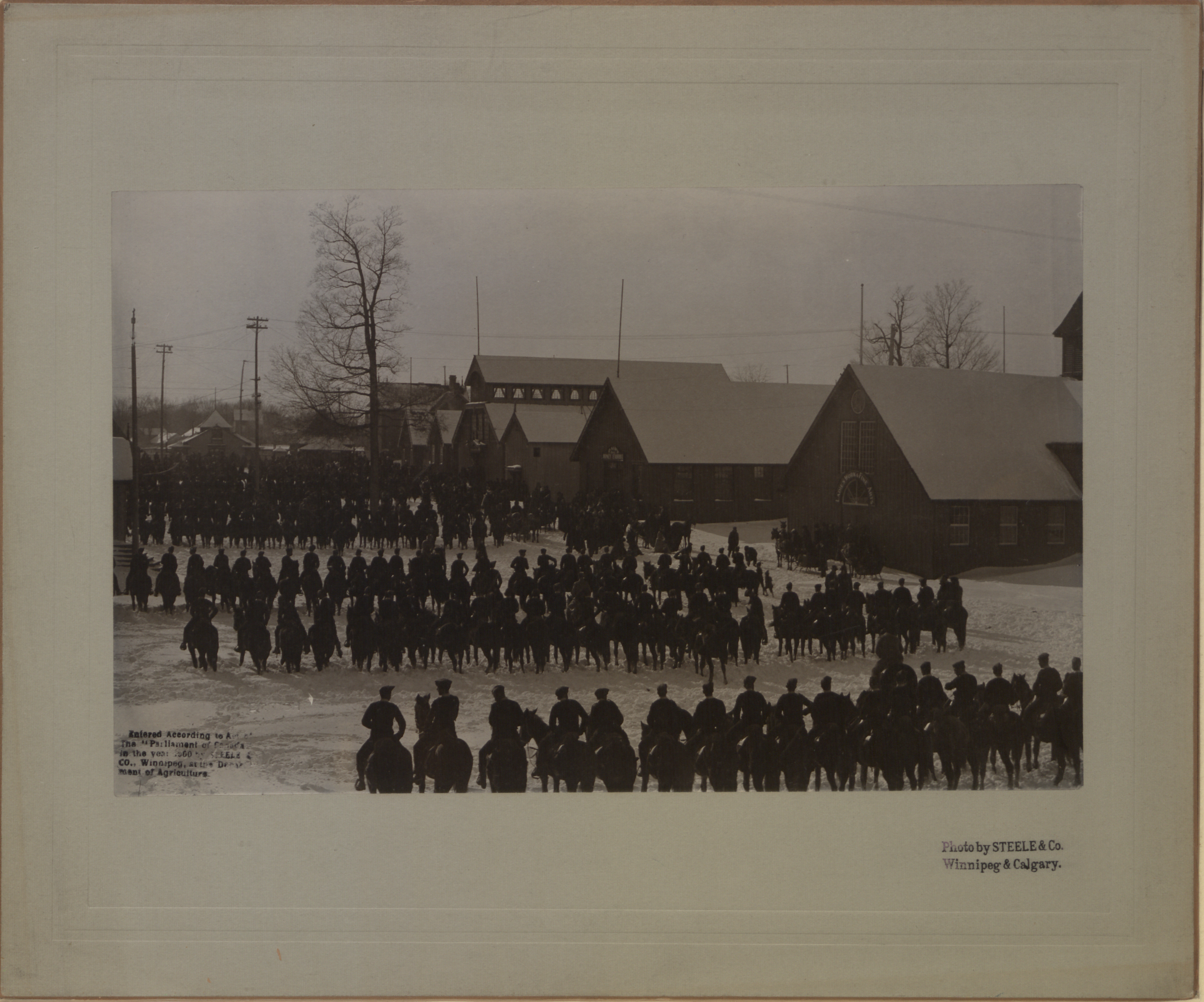
A mounted review of Strathcona's Horse in Ottawa, 7 March 1900.

The troop is designed to be a link to the regiment's time as a cavalry unit in the early 20th century. The first members of the regiment were trained horsemen, who were recruited to serve as a match for the Boers in South Africa and to make up for the losses of the British Army's infantry. A similar purpose was given to the regiment when it joined the Royal Canadian Horse Artillery as part of the combined Canadian Cavalry Brigade during the First World War. The regiment established a ceremonial musical ride to perpetuate this history in 1923. It performed actively in Western Canada and the Northwestern United States until it was dissolved in 1939 following the start of the Second World War in Europe. The Strathcona Mounted Troop was re-formed in 1974 in time for the regiment's 75th anniversary and the centennial of Calgary. It became a regular component of the regiment in 1977, and has since been designated the Strathcona Mounted Troop, to perpetuate the memory of the original mounted regiment. The troop was renamed the Strathcona Mounted Troop in 1991. The troop mounted the Queen's Life Guard at Buckingham Palace in September 2000, being the first time a unit other than the Household Cavalry or the Royal Horse Artillery provided a mounted guard in London, and again in 2025 to celebrate 125 years since the regiment was raised.

It consists of 28 soldiers who perform in communities throughout Western Canada. In its shows, which are usually 35 minutes long, it combines traditional cavalry drill with the tent pegging that is often seen in equestrian sports. The soldiers in the troop volunteer for a minimum of one show season. Its membership is restricted to soldiers of LdSH(RC).

The organization consists of the following:

- Leadership
  - Troop leader
  - Troop sergeant
  - Troop master corporal
  - Troop ride master
- 1st Section
  - 8 mounted troopers
- 2nd Section
  - 8 mounted troopers

=== Foundation ===
The Ceremonial Mounted Troop Foundation is a non-profit organization that provides financial support to the troop, as the troop receives no funding from the Department of National Defence, and is responsible for the maintenance of stock, uniforms and equipment of the unit. The foundation is a registered charity and relies on donations from show sponsors. Additional funding comes from honorariums provided by organizations and cities where the troop performs. The foundation in 1998 received a 20-horse trailer provided by one of its sponsors, Bison Transport in Winnipeg, to aid in transportation of the troop from venue to venue. The approximate cost to operate the unit is $150,000 annually.

=== Dress uniform ===
The current full dress uniform was adopted in the 1970s, patterned around the regimental uniforms of the 1920s. It is the No. 1B dress, and consists of a scarlet tunic with myrtle green facings, and a dragoon helmet with red and white plume. Its uniform is similar to those worn by the Household Cavalry in the United Kingdom, specifically the Life Guards.

== See also ==
- Musical Ride
- The Governor General's Horse Guards
