= Jacques Monet =

Canadian historian (1930–2024)

The Reverend Jacques Monet SJ FRSC
- Born: January 26, 1930; Saint-Jean-sur-Richelieu, Quebec, Canada
- Died: May 14, 2024 (aged 94); Pickering, Ontario, Canada
- Occupations: Historian, Catholic priest

Jacques Monet, SJ FRSC (January 26, 1930 – May 14, 2024) was a Canadian historian and Catholic priest. He was a member of the Society of Jesus.

== Biography ==
Born in Saint-Jean-sur-Richelieu, Quebec, Monet joined the Society of Jesus in 1949 and was ordained in 1966. He studied history at Université Laval and the University of Toronto, where he received a PhD in history.

Monet joined the department of history of the University of Ottawa in 1969 and was the chairman of the department from 1972 to 1976. He left in 1980 to join Regis College, Toronto. He was president of the Canadian Historical Association from 1975 to 1976. He was also rector of the University of Sudbury.

In 2012, Monet was appointed to the Advisory Committee on Vice-Regal Appointments by Stephen Harper.

Monet died in Pickering, Ontario, on May 14, 2024, at the age of 94.

== Selected bibliography ==
- The Last Cannon Shot: A Study of French-Canadian Nationalism 1837-1850 (1969) ISBN 0802052118 LCCN 70-455781
- The Canadian Crown (1979) ISBN 0772012520 LCCN 80-453228
  - French version: La monarchie au Canada. Le Cercle du livre de France. 1979. ISBN 2890510123. LCCN 79125761; 96 pages : illustrated; 21 x 27 cm.
- Union of the Canadas 1837-1867 (1985) ISBN 0717218678 OL 16355380M
