= Polymer Corporation =

Canadian federal crown corporation

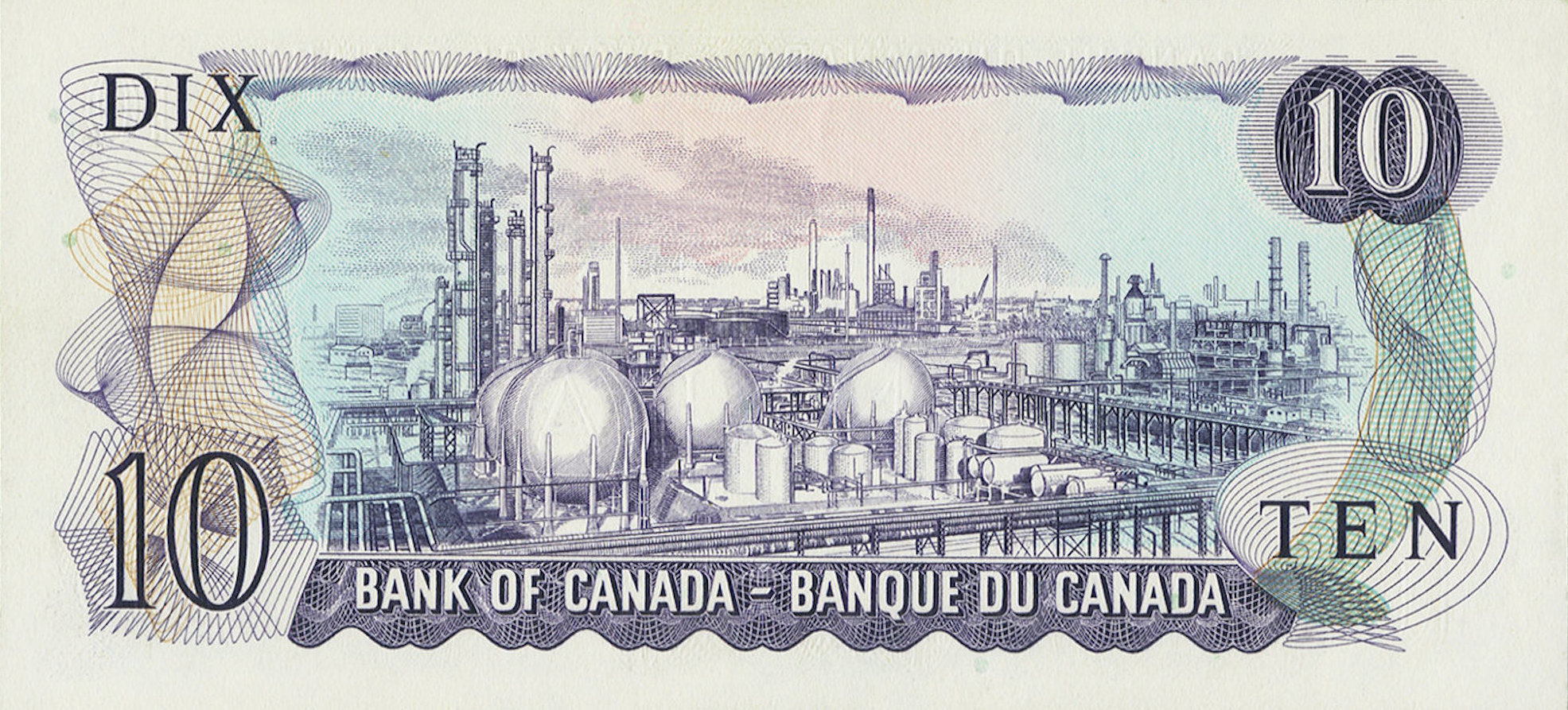
Polymer Corporation's plant in Sarnia as depicted on the Bank of Canada $10 note issued in 1971

Polymer Corporation was a Canadian federal crown corporation established in 1942 to produce artificial rubber to substitute for overseas supply cut off by World War II. After the Japanese captured the Dutch East Indies in 1942, most of the world's supply of natural rubber was out of Allied hands. Due to the importance of rubber products for both modern life and modern warfare, the loss of such an important resource at this phase in the war was a crisis. A factory was established in Sarnia, Ontario, using German patents on the Buna-S technology from an American licensee (IG Farben and Standard Oil of New Jersey jointly held the rights). Polymer produced approximately 3,300 tons of synthetic rubber from oil every month from when production first began at the end of 1943 to the wars end in 1945.

Sarnia was chosen because it is the point of intake the most secure and reliable source of crude oil coming into Canada; a type suitable for the synthetic rubber making process. The site was also chosen due to the adjacent St. Clair River which provides the necessary water supply for the production of synthetic rubber. The product was used in everything from tires to airplane parts and much of it was sold to the US as part of the common war effort. With the combination of synthetic rubber produced by Polymer, reclaimed rubber, and rubber product rationing, Canada was able to meet its war-time needs.

The company was considered a roaring success, more efficient than its American counterparts and a national asset. Clarence Decatur Howe, under whose Department of Munitions and Supply the company fell, decided to keep Polymer going as a Crown corporation after the war. Even as early as 1942, Howe said, "I don't think we will ever go back to crude rubber." It was a highly profitable enterprise, and he was not convinced that any buyer would pay a proper price or keep it going. Polymer therefore survived the war, reporting through Howe and his successors to Parliament until 1971 when it was sold to the Canada Development Corporation which was a government controlled enterprise. The company was also involved in the petrochemicals industry, primarily in the production of polyurethane. It was renamed Polysar in 1976 and the rubber component became a subsidiary, Polysar Rubber Corp.

The company became infamous for its pollution spills, including 48 spills reported in the Sarnia area between 1972 and 1984 alone. After a 1985 report showing that Polysar had more spills than any of its neighbours, further spills occurred: 7,000 gallons of oil on 25 July 1986 and 28,000 gallons of partially treated wastewater on 19 August 1986, and many more in subsequent years. By 1989, Polysar Ltd was listed among the "dirty dozen" polluters in Ontario:

'Although Polysar is smaller than its neighbour, Dow Chemical, environmentalists consider Polysar a worse enemy because of its record of spills.... Polysar, says Environment Minister Jim Bradley, still has a lot of cleaning up to do. He called the "hundreds" of spills by Polysar and others into the St. Clair River since 1985 "one of the major pollution sources of the world's largest source of fresh water, the Great Lakes."'

The company was privatized in 1988 with its sale to NOVA Corp which, in turn, sold Polysar Rubber in 1990 to Bayer AG of Germany. The original Sarnia production facilities were shut down through a series of closures from 1995 through 2002, but the site remains active, operating facilities built through expansion beginning in the 1980s. In 2005 Bayer AG spun off chemical divisions, including most of the Sarnia site, creating LANXESS AG, also of Germany.

Polymer's contribution was recognized by the 1971 Canadian ten-dollar note of the Scenes of Canada series, which depicted a scene of its operations on the reverse. The image was used because the company had "achieved a world-wide reputation" and the image "provided detail ideally suited to engraving".

It has been cited as an example of how crown corporations can be profitable over a sustained period of time and contribute to the economy.

== Archives ==
There is a Polysar archives fonds at Library and Archives Canada. Archival reference number is R14901.
