= Nicholas Morant =

Canadian photographer

Nicholas Everard Morant CM
- Born: 29 June 1910; Kamloops, British Columbia, Canada
- Died: 13 March 1999 (aged 88); Calgary, Alberta
- Occupation: photographer

Nicholas Everard Morant CM (29 June 1910 – 13 March 1999) was a Canadian photographer who produced iconic images of the Canadian Pacific Railway.

== Career ==
Morant was the special photographer of the Canadian Pacific from 1929 until 1935, and then again from 1944 until his retirement in 1981. His work was especially influential in promoting tourism in Western Canada and the Canadian Rockies and included many images of the Canadian Pacific's flagship streamliner The Canadian. One of Morant's favourite shooting locations is located in the Canadian Rockies East of Lake Louise, Alberta where the CPR mainline parallels the Bow River. This location now bears the geographic placename Morant's Curve in his honour. Accessible from the Bow Valley Parkway, it remains a favourite of photographers. His images were not only used in promotional material for the railway but also were used subsequently in Canadian currency and postage stamps. His images also appeared in Time, Life, National Geographic, Reader's Digest, and The Saturday Evening Post.

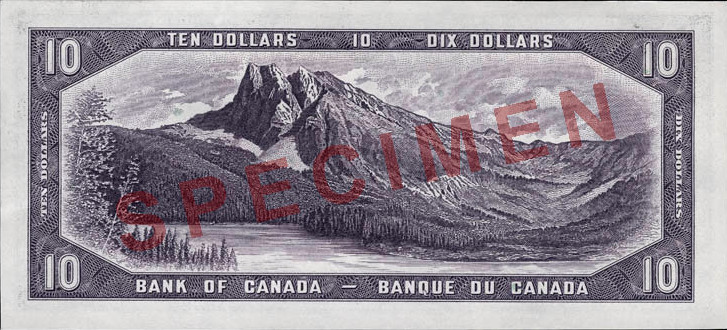
Reverse of 1954 Canadian $10 banknote based on a photograph of Nicholas Morant

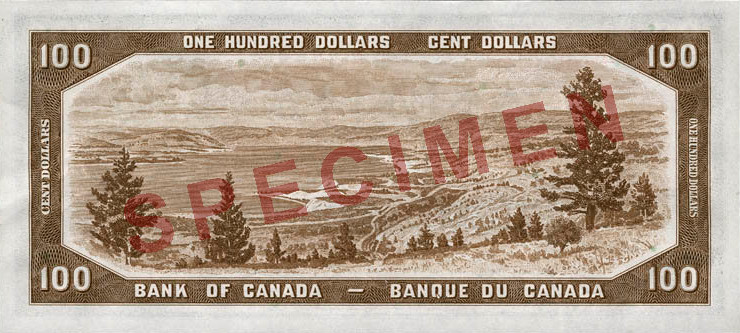
Reverse of 1954 Canadian $100 banknote based on a photograph of Nicholas Morant

From 1935 to 1939, Morant also found employment as a news photographer for the Winnipeg Free Press, but returned to the Canadian Pacific in 1939. Serious injuries from a bear attack in 1939 precluded his enlistment in the military during WWII, but he was "loaned" to the Canadian Bureau of Public Information as a wartime photographer between 1940 and 1944, during which period he extensively documented the Canadian war effort. An image from this era was engraved for use on a Canadian fifty cent stamp of the time. His photos were also subsequently featured on the backs of Canadian currency. This included the Canadian $10 bill of the 1954 series, featuring of a scene of Emerald Lake and Mount Burgess in Yoho National Park photographed by Morant and engraved by Harry P. Dawson. The $100 Canadian bill of the 1954 series featured an image of Okanagan Lake captured by Morant in 1947 and engraved by William Ford. The final image of Morant's to appear on Canadian currency was an engraving based on a photograph of Moraine Lake in the Valley of the Ten Peaks, which was featured on the $20 bill from the 1969 Scenes of Canada banknote series.

As he worked for the majority of his career as a commercial photographer, relatively few of his images appear to be presently in the public domain. However, the Canadian Pacific Railway archives maintains over 12,000 images captured by Morant over the course of his career, and the Whyte Museum of the Canadian Rockies maintains the Nicholas Morant Fonds, which contains over 50,000 photographs by or of Morant, as well as numerous negatives, scrapbooks, and sound recordings.

In 1990, Morant was invested as a Member of the Order of Canada in honour of his valuable contributions to Canadian heritage and culture.

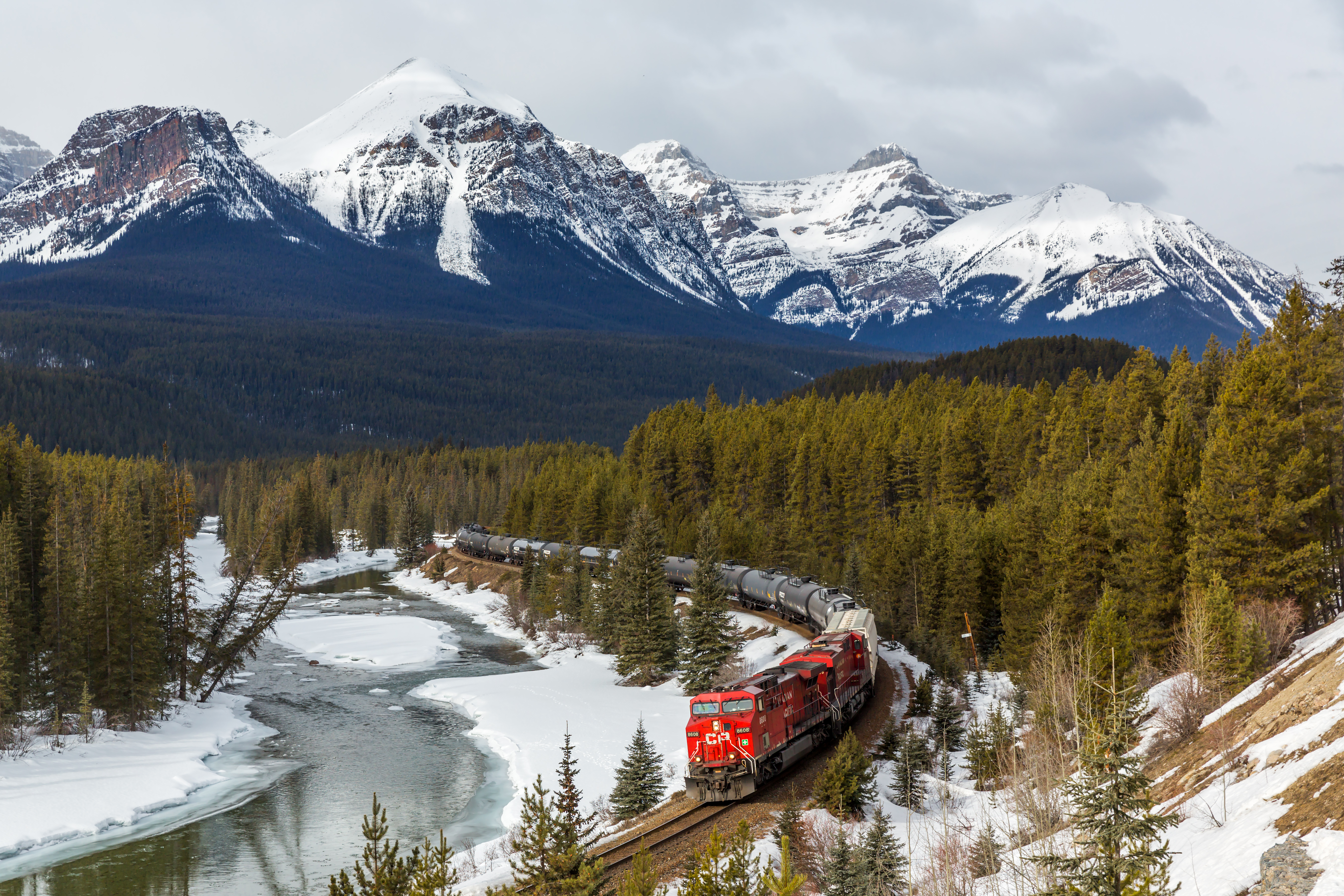
Morant's Curve in Banff National Park
