= Scenes of Canada =

1970 Canadian banknote series

Scenes of Canada is the fourth series of banknotes of the Canadian dollar issued by the Bank of Canada. It was first circulated in 1970 to succeed the 1954 Canadian Landscape series and was followed by the 1986 Birds of Canada banknote series. This was the last series to feature a $1 bill, which was replaced by a $1 coin known as the loonie in 1987, although both the $1 bill and the loonie were produced concurrently for 21 months, from June 1987 to April 1989.

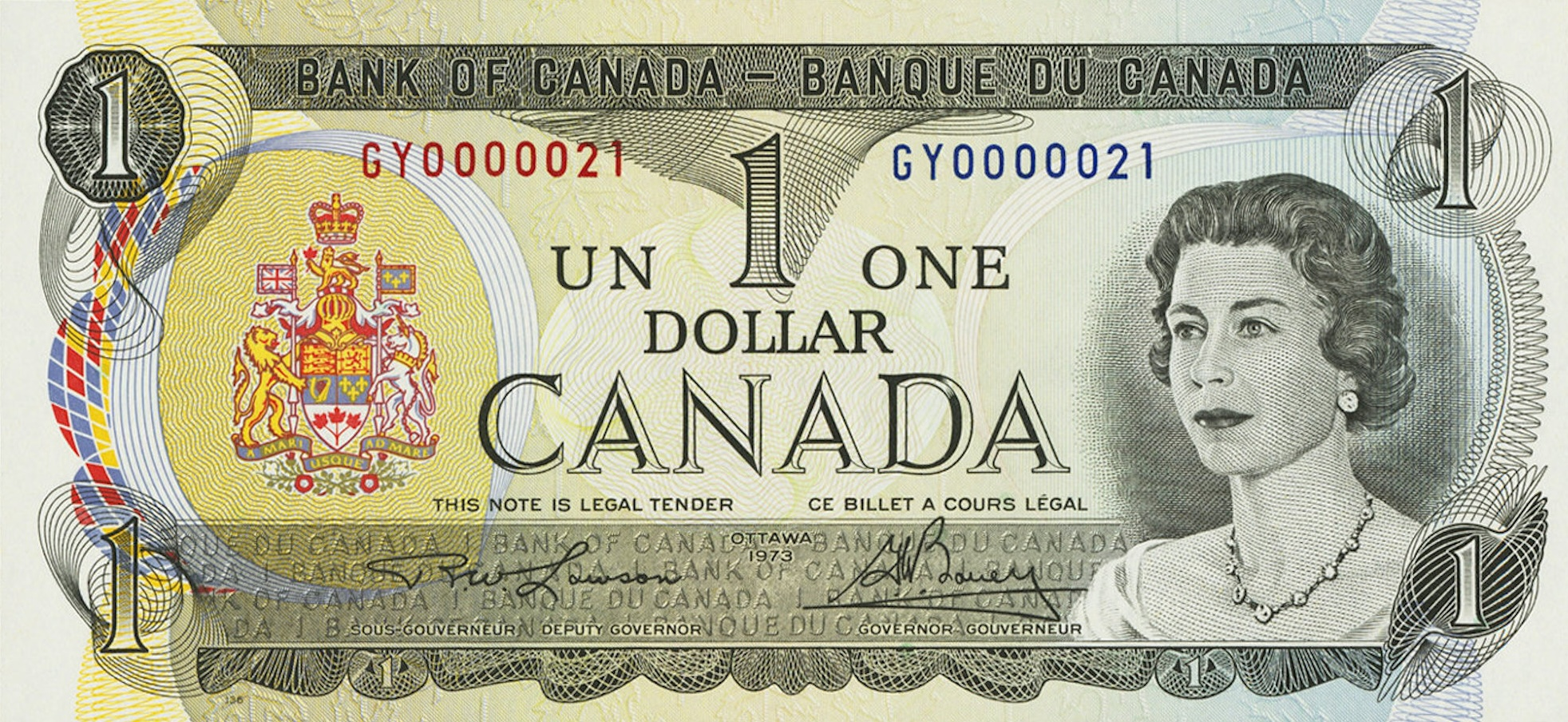
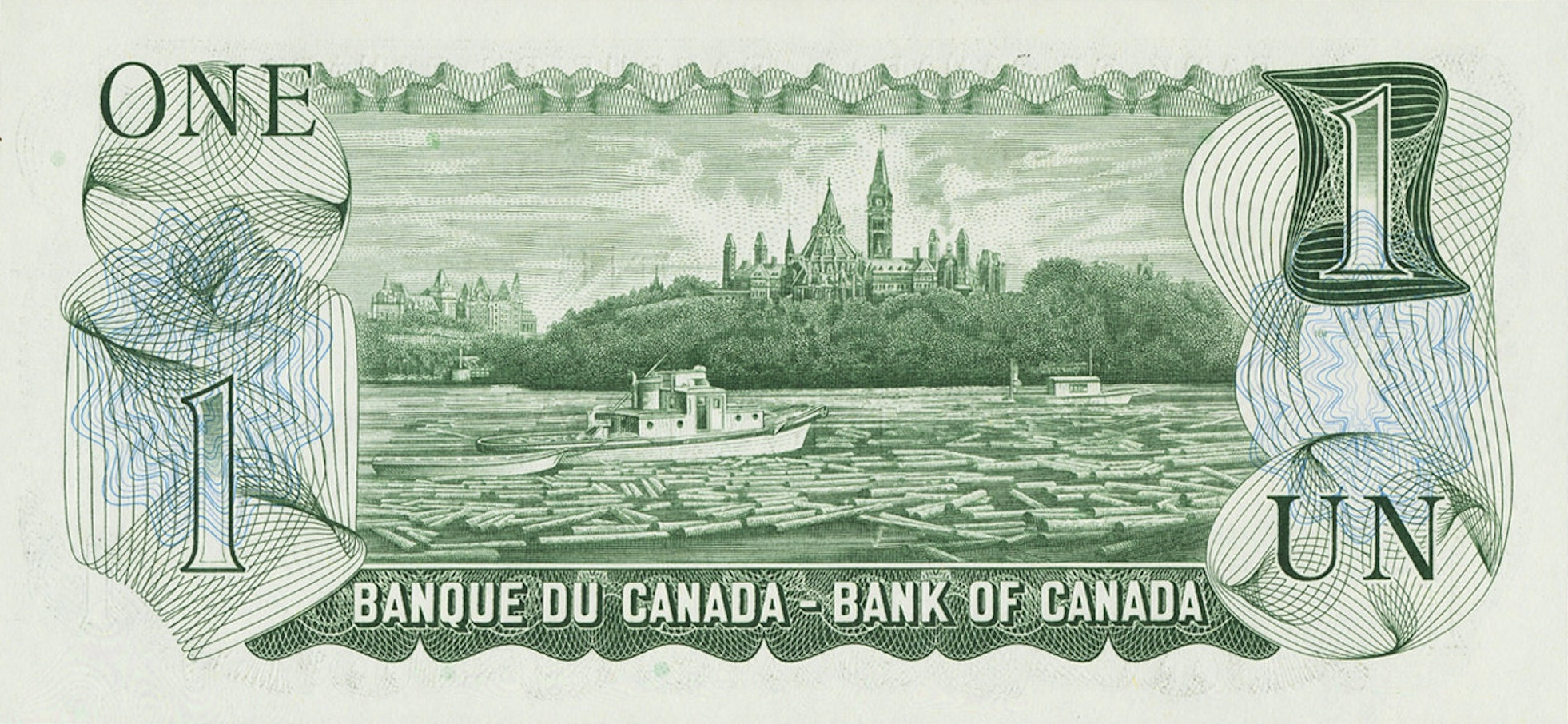
1974 one dollar note, Scenes of Canada series

== Origins ==
The design proposed by Organisation Giori, as depicted for the obverse (top) and reverse (bottom) of the $10 banknote. The design was ultimately rejected.

The design process for this series began in 1963 with a primary goal of creating banknotes that were more counterfeit-resistant than the 1954 Canadian Landscape series it was to replace. The Bank of Canada requested design submissions from security printing companies, receiving several from both domestic and foreign companies. One proposed design was received from Organisation Giori, a Swiss security printer based in Lausanne that had developed a multicolour printing press "that raised the bar on banknote security". Its designs for the $10 and $20 banknotes were a "significant departure" from traditional Canadian banknote designs by incorporating more colours, new graphic elements, and different security features, but the design was rejected.

== Design ==
Final conceptual designs for the series were created by Canadian Bank Note Company, British American Bank Note Company, and De La Rue, the latter being the first foreign firm involved in the design of Canadian banknotes. The design by De La Rue was selected by the Bank of Canada in 1964 as the basis for the new series.

Each denomination retained the dominant colour of the respective banknote from the Canadian Landscape series: green for the $1 banknote, orange (terracotta) for the $2 banknote, blue for the $5 banknote, mauve (purple) for the $10 banknote, burnt orange (red) for the $50 banknote, and brown for the $100 banknote. Because of the multicoloured tints used to complement the design for each banknote, Bank of Canada staff began referring to the series as the "multicoloured series".

The portraits on the obverse of each denomination were larger than for the same denomination in the Canadian Landscape series. Initially, all denominations were to feature the portrait of Elizabeth II, but portraits of former prime ministers were used for some denominations at the request of Edgar Benson, the Minister of Finance in 1968, to "reflect Canada's burgeoning national identity". The vertical borders of the obverse were curvilinear, the left edge of which had "multicoloured diamonds" bordering a circular frame within which was the Coat of Arms. It also featured "sweeping guilloché" patterns.

The reverse of each denomination had a scenic vignette. The initial design by De La Rue included a circular watermark that was excluded from the final design. A memorandum circulated to designers during the design process stated that the "subjects chosen represent a substantial improvement in range of contrast and detail", to improve security.

The phrase "will pay to the bearer on demand" that appeared in earlier banknote series was replaced by the phrase "this note is legal tender", reflecting the fact that Canadian banknotes had long since ceased to be redeemable in gold.

== Security ==
Colourful, wavy patterns were part of each denomination's design. The serial numbers on the obverse were printed in red on the left and blue on the right.

In addition, this is the first series that has interleaving position of English and French text. The interleaving nature is by text on the same side, as well as by denomination. The following table is a complete representation of all positions of English texts on all denominations.

	$1	$2	$5	$10	$20	$50	$100
"Bank of Canada" on obverse	L	R	L	R	L	R	L
Value on obverse	R	L	R	L	R	L	R
"This note is legal tender"	L	R	R	L	L	L	R
"Deputy governor"	R	R	R	L	L	R	L
"Governor"	L	R	R	L	L	R	L
Value on reverse	L	R	L	R	L	R	L
"Bank of Canada" on reverse	R	L	R	L	L	L	R

== Banknotes ==
Denomination	Face image	Back image	Dominant colour	Face	Back	Printed	Issued	Withdrawn
$1			Green and black	Elizabeth II	Parliament Hill and Ottawa River, Ontario	1973	3 June 1974	30 June 1989
$2			Terra cotta	Elizabeth II	Inuit hunting on Baffin Island, Northwest Territories (now Nunavut)	1974	5 August 1975	2 September 1986
$5			Blue	Wilfrid Laurier	Salmon seiner BCP45, Johnstone Strait, British Columbia	1972	4 December 1972	1 October 1979
$5			Blue	Wilfrid Laurier	Salmon seiner BCP45, Johnstone Strait, British Columbia	1979	1 October 1979	28 April 1986
$10			Purple	John A. Macdonald	Polymer Corporation, Sarnia, Ontario	1971	8 November 1971	27 June 1989
$20			Olive green	Elizabeth II	Moraine Lake, Alberta	1969	22 June 1970	18 December 1978
$20			Olive green	Elizabeth II	Moraine Lake, Alberta	1979	18 December 1978	29 June 1993
$50			Red	William Lyon Mackenzie King	RCMP Musical Ride	1975	31 March 1975	1 December 1989
$100			Brown	Robert Borden	Lunenburg Harbour, Nova Scotia	1975	31 May 1976	3 December 1990

The dates stamped on the banknotes represent the year in which the original intaglio plates were produced for that denomination. The most prominent designer for this series was C. Gordon Yorke, who engraved the portraits of Robert Borden and Wilfrid Laurier and the vignettes for four of the seven denominations. The series was the first Bank of Canada series not to include a $1,000 note; the Canadian Landscape design of this bill continued to be printed during this series's run, with an updated $1,000 note appearing in the Birds of Canada series in 1992.

All notes measure 152.4 by 69.85 millimetres (6 in × 2 3/4 in).

=== $1 note ===
The original design for the $1 banknote used green as the dominant colour, but final designs used black to mitigate possible confusion with the $20 banknote.

The portrait on the obverse is of Elizabeth II, the engraving for which was created by George Gunderson, master engraver at British American Bank Note Company. A tugboat is prominent in the foreground of the vignette on the reverse, which depicts the Ottawa River with a broken log boom with Parliament Hill in the background. It was engraved by Yorke based on a 1963 photograph taken by Malak Karsh.

The banknote was first circulated in June 1974 and was printed by both CBN and BABN. The final print run for the banknote was on 20 April 1989, two years after the $1 coin had been introduced. The run was circulated by the end of June 1989, after which banks were required to refrain from circulating the banknotes and to send collected $1 banknotes to the Bank of Canada for destruction.

=== $2 note ===
The portrait on the obverse is of Elizabeth II.

The reverse of the $2 banknote features a scene of six men of an Inuit family preparing their kayaks for a hunt, based on a 1950s photograph of Joseph and Paul Idlout and their relatives taken at Pond Inlet in Baffin Island by Douglas Wilkinson. It was engraved by Yorke, and was originally intended to be used on the reverse of the $100 banknote.

The $2 banknote was first circulated in August 1975 and was printed by BABN.

=== $5 note ===
The portrait on the obverse is of Wilfrid Laurier, the engraving for which was created by Yorke.

The vignette on the reverse was based on a photograph by George Hunter and engraved by George Gunderson and Yorke. It depicts a salmon seiner in the Johnstone Strait, a channel along the northeast coast of Vancouver Island.

The $5 banknote was first circulated in December 1972 and was printed by CBN. An updated version was issued in 1979, for which the serial numbers were moved to the bottom centre of the reverse and the central obverse guilloché was modified.

=== $10 note ===
The portrait on the obverse is of John A. Macdonald, for which the engraving was created by Gunderson.

A scene depicting the operations of Polymer Corporation in Sarnia, Ontario is on the reverse, chosen because the Crown corporation had "achieved a world-wide reputation" and the image "provided detail ideally suited to engraving", according to a Bank of Canada memorandum. The engraving was made by De La Rue based on a photograph taken by George Hunter.

The $10 banknote was first circulated in November 1971 and was printed by CBN.

=== $20 note ===
The portrait on the obverse is of Elizabeth II. The reverse depicts a scene of the Canadian Rockies, specifically Moraine Lake in the Valley of the Ten Peaks, based on a photograph from the Canadian Pacific Railway archives taken by Nicholas Morant. The original engraving for the reverse was prepared by De La Rue, but because the mountains "did not seem authentic", an engraving prepared by BABN was used instead.

It was unveiled at a press conference by the Bank of Canada on 18 June 1970, and released into circulation four days later. It was printed by CBN and BABN. An updated version was issued in December 1978 (dated 1979), for which the serial numbers were moved to the bottom centre of the reverse, the central obverse design was modified, and the secondary colours were more strongly emphasized to further differentiate the $20 banknote from the $1 banknote. It was both the first and last of the Scenes of Canada banknotes to be printed, with the final printings taking place in 1993, seven years after the Birds of Canada series of banknotes had been introduced.

=== $50 note ===
The portrait on the obverse is of William Lyon Mackenzie King, based on a photograph by Karsh and engraved by Gunderson.

The reverse depicts a dome formation from the Musical Ride of the Royal Canadian Mounted Police (RCMP). The vignette was suggested by Sterling Suggett, a researcher and banknote designer employed by the Bank of Canada, to honour the RCMP's centennial in 1973 and was based on a photograph taken by Donald K. Guerrette. The image made this banknote the most popular of the series. Originally, the vignette was to depict a frozen lake based on a photograph taken near Sudbury, Ontario, but it was rejected because the orange ink had a limited tonal range. A photograph from a National Ballet of Canada performance of Swan Lake that had been proposed for the $1,000 banknote was chosen instead as the well-proportioned scene provided "an opportunity for truly virtuoso engraving". A proof engraving was prepared by George Gunderson using slate grey as the dominant colour, but disappointed with the result suggested using "a shade between orchid and claret". This led to the change to the Musical Ride image.

The banknote's colouration was to be the same as that of the $50 banknote of the 1954 Series, but because the Bank of Canada discontinued using the heavy metal required to make the "traditional brilliant orange tint" ink, the colour was thus changed to red.

The banknote was first circulated in March 1975 and printed by CBN.

=== $100 note ===
The portrait on the obverse is of Robert Borden, for which the engraving was prepared by Yorke. The vignette on the reverse is of the harbour at Lunenburg in Nova Scotia, based on a photograph taken by G. Hedley Doty of the Nova Scotia Information Service and engraved by Yorke.

It was printed by BABN, first circulated in May 1976, and was the last of the Scenes of Canada series banknotes to be introduced.

== Production ==
The banknote printers had to buy new equipment to be able to print the banknotes for this series. Originally, the obverse was printed with one intaglio plate and three lithographic plates and the reverse was printed with one intaglio plate and two lithographic plates, except for the $50 banknote, for which an intaglio plate was not used. In 1984, the Bank of Canada changed the printing process used for printing the reverse of each banknote, using only lithography instead of the steel engraving and lithography that had been previously used, and continued to be used for the obverse This resulted in a smoother reverse and "slightly sharper" obverse.

In 1979, the design of the $5 and the $20 was modified and the printing process updated to enable automated processing of the banknotes using machines.

=== Printing ===
Each printing of the banknote series is signed by the Governor of the Bank of Canada and the deputy governor.

Governor	Deputy Governor	Printing years	Denominations
Louis Rasminsky	John Robert Beattie	1969–1971	$10, $20 (1970)
Louis Rasminsky	Gerald Bouey	1972–1973	$5 (1972), $10, $20 (1970)
Gerald Bouey	R. William Lawson	1973–1984	$1, $2, $5 (1972, 1979), $10, $20 (1970, 1979), $50, $100
Gerald Bouey	John Crow	1984–1987	$1, $2, $5 (1979), $10, $20 (1979), $50, $100
John Crow	Gordon Thiessen	1987–1993	$10, $20 (1979), $50, $100

== Counterfeiting ==
Offset printing could not accurately reproduce the range of tints complementing the dominant colour of the banknotes, resulting in a dramatic reduction of counterfeits in circulation. The counterfeit ratio remained very low from 1977 to 1990.

In October 1984, counterfeit $20 banknotes deemed to be of "good quality" were found circulating in Niagara Falls, leading to the confiscation of counterfeit banknotes with a face value of $2.2 million.

In 2007, counterfeit $100 banknotes were found circulating in Regina and Moose Jaw, Saskatchewan. These lacked the fine line details present in the genuine banknotes, and had a different texture. In 2012, counterfeit $50 banknotes were found circulating in parts of Nova Scotia. Banknotes from this series (and all prior to the 2011 polymer series) are now considered unfit for circulation due to their lacking of modern security features like that of a metallic stripe. Financial institutions must return the banknotes to the Bank of Canada, which will destroy them. Individuals may keep the banknotes indefinitely.

== Collecting ==
By 1989, the Bank of Canada had sold over 50,000 uncut sheets of the $1 banknote, each containing 40 notes with sequential serial numbers. It earned over $3 million in revenue from the sale of uncut sheets of the $1 banknote.

== Legacy ==
When first issued into circulation, there were about 370 million banknotes in circulation from the 1954 Series, 1937 Series, and 1935 Series, having a total face value of about $3.4 billion. With the release of the first banknote in June 1970, newspaper articles began referring to the banknote series as "multicoloured money" and the "rainbow series", and stating that multicoloured banknotes were returning to Canada since the Bank of Canada had assumed the role as the country's only banknote supplier in 1935. Some retailers did not believe that the $20, the first banknote of the series issued into circulation, was real currency.

Because of wearing from use, the average banknote had a life expectancy of between nine and twelve months before being withdrawn from circulation. In June 1987, the Bank of Canada announced that the $1 banknote would be replaced by the loonie, a $1 coin with a longer lifespan that would reduce production costs for the central bank by about $175 million over 20 years. It expected to cease distribution of the $1 banknote by January 1989, but ultimately delayed the final distribution until 30 June 1989. About 19 million banknote stack wrappers were printed with the words "Be ready for the change! Order and use the new coin now!" in preparation for the change. The Bank of Canada stated that withdrawing most of the 300 million $1 banknotes from circulation would take about three months. The Royal Canadian Mint also increased the number of loonies released into circulation from 1 million in January 1989 to 9.8 million during one week in June. Acceptance of the loonie was initially poor, so banks and retailers continued to conduct transactions using the banknotes. By March 1989, support for the change to the $1 coin was 39% among Canadians surveyed by the Royal Canadian Mint, and 36% were opposed to the change.

Withdrawal of the $1 banknote resulted in operational cost reductions for some businesses and organizations, such as the Toronto Transit Commission which previously invested over US$500,000 paying individuals to unfold banknotes collected in fare boxes.

The city of Hull in Quebec purchased the tugboat depicted on the $1 banknote, named Missinaibi, which is now housed behind the Canadian Museum of History beside the Ottawa River.
