= J. Greg Peters =

Canadian civil servant, and current Usher of the Black Rod

John Gregory Peters MVO
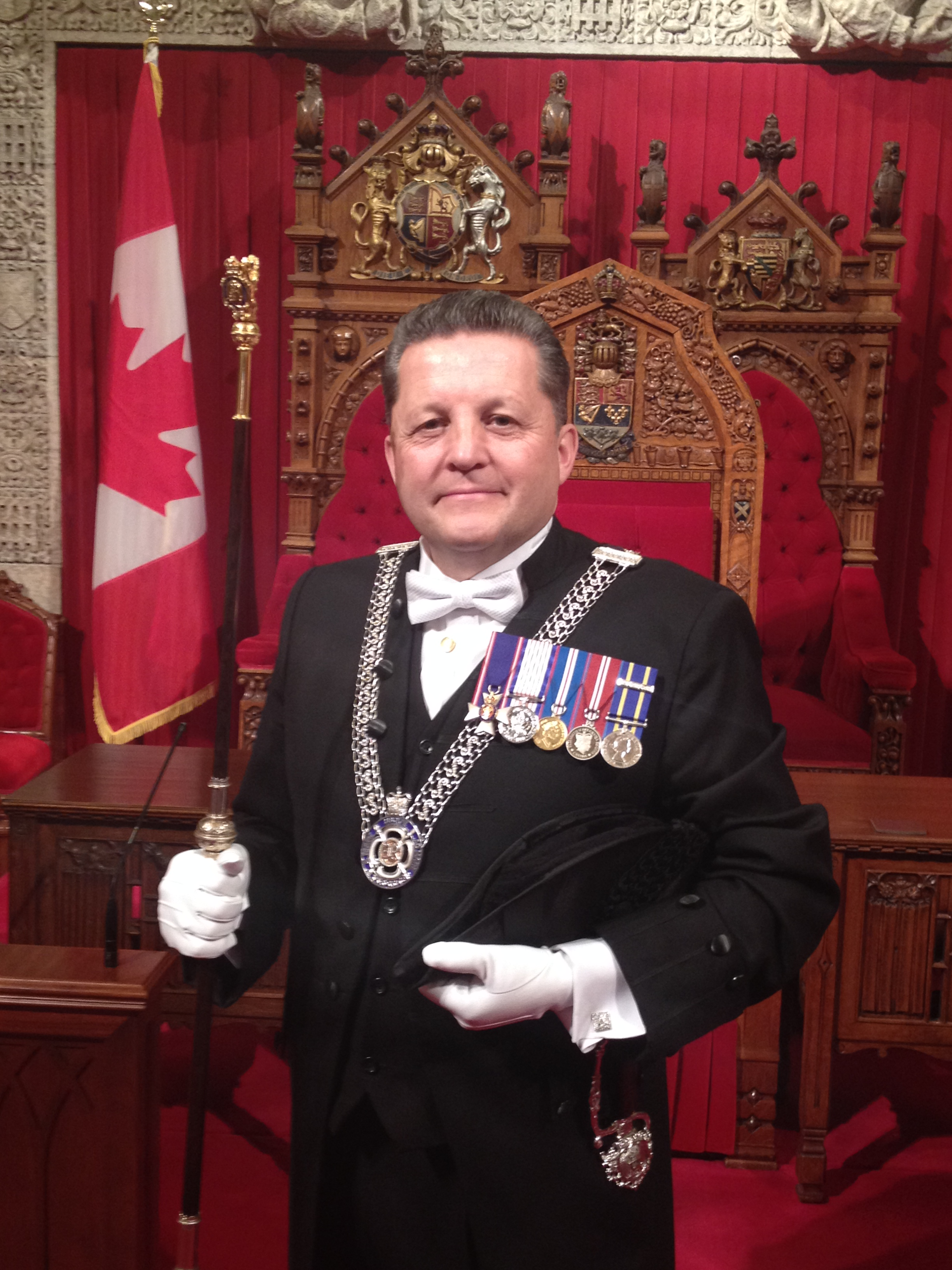

16th Usher of the Black Rod
- Incumbent
- Assumed office October 1, 2013
- Monarchs: Elizabeth II; Charles III
- Governors General: David Johnston; Julie Payette; Mary Simon; Louise Arbour
- Prime Minister: Stephen Harper; Justin Trudeau; Mark Carney
- Preceded by: Blair Armitage (Acting)

Personal details
- Born: John Gregory Peters; November 15, 1960 (age 65) Souris West, Prince Edward Island, Canada
- Education: University of Ottawa

John Gregory Peters MVO (born November 15, 1960) is a retired superintendent of the Royal Canadian Mounted Police and the current usher of the Black Rod of the Senate of Canada. He was appointed to the position by order of the governor-in-council effective October 1, 2013. He was re-appointed on October 1, 2018, for another 5-year term.

== Personal life ==
A native of Souris West, Prince Edward Island, Peters was heavily involved in volunteering for St. John Ambulance as a youth, teaching first aid and CPR in the local community. He was later certified in advanced first aid. Peters went on to study political science and history at the University of Prince Edward Island, later completing his undergraduate degree in political science at the University of Ottawa. He has also completed a graduate certificate in public sector leadership and governance at the University of Ottawa.

== Career ==
Peters joined the Royal Canadian Mounted Police in 1981 and trained at the RCMP Academy in Regina. Early years saw him go from municipal policing in Flin Flon, Manitoba to small town and Indigenous policing in southern Manitoba. In 1984, he was assigned to protective duties for the royal tour of Her Majesty Queen Elizabeth II to Manitoba.

In 1987, Peters was accepted to the RCMP equestrian drill team, the Musical Ride. His first tour was Europe for a period of three months in 1988, staying as a guest at Windsor Castle and stabling in the Royal Mews. This was his first personal encounter with Her Majesty The Queen and members of the Royal Family.

In 1993, Peters served with the United Nations Civilian Police contingent in Port-au-Prince, Haiti. He was one of the first 25 RCMP members deployed, and served as spokesperson for the contingent. From 1997 to 1998, Peters was assigned to the Federal Law Enforcement Training Centre in Glynco, Georgia, where he facilitated senior police leadership sessions for local, state, and federal law enforcement agencies throughout the United States.

In 2002, Peters led the design and development of the RCMP Musical Ride Centre at the RCMP Stables at Rockcliffe, Ottawa. He organized the official opening of the Centre by Her Majesty Queen Elizabeth II on 14 October 2002 to celebrate the Queen's Golden Jubilee.

In 2007, as the RCMP contingent commander, Peters led the ceremonial and protocol functions for the official arrival of Queen Elizabeth II and Prime Minister Stephen Harper for the ceremony commemorating the 90th anniversary of the Battle of Vimy Ridge.

As the director of strategic partnerships and heritage for the RCMP, Peters was a key player in the repatriation of the Sir Sam Steele collection from the United Kingdom to Canada in 2008. The collection, which was at risk of being broken up and auctioned off, now rests with the University of Alberta and the Glenbow Museum.

Peters led the RCMP guard of honour at the Canada Reception Centre for official visits to Canada by foreign heads of state and heads of government. He also led the ceremonial salute at the Embassy of Canada, Washington, D.C., for the inauguration of Barack Obama as President of the United States in 2009 and 2013.

Peters organized the official presentation of RCMP horses to The Queen in 2009 and 2012, and played a significant role in royal tours to Canada by the Queen and Prince Philip, Duke of Edinburgh, in 2010, Charles, Prince of Wales, and Camilla, Duchess of Cornwall, in 2009 and 2012, and Prince William, Duke of Cambridge, and Catherine, Duchess of Cambridge, in 2011.

Peters served as the RCMP Diamond Jubilee contingent commander at the Royal Windsor Horse Show tribute to the Queen in 2012, and the historic mounting of the Queen's Life Guard by the RCMP in London on 23 May 2012. This marked the first time that a non-British semi-military unit formed the Queen's Life Guard since the 17th century.

Peters was the only Canadian named to the Royal Victorian Order in the 2013 New Year Honours.

Peters retired from the RCMP on September 30, 2013, at the rank of superintendent, after 32 years of service. His appointment as Usher of the Black Rod took effect on October 1, 2013.

== Medals and Awards ==

| Ribbon | Description | Notes |
| | Member of the Royal Victorian Order | MVO |
| | Order of St. John | |
| | 125th Anniversary of the Confederation of Canada Medal | |
| | Queen Elizabeth II Golden Jubilee Medal | |
| | Queen Elizabeth II Diamond Jubilee Medal | |
| | King Charles III Coronation Medal | |
| | Royal Canadian Mounted Police Long Service Medal | |
| | Service Medal of the Most Venerable Order of the Hospital of St. John of Jerusalem | |
| | Queen Elizabeth II Platinum Jubilee Medal | |

Peters also received the Public Service Award of Excellence in 2008.

Coat of arms of J. Greg Peters
| Notes Granted 15 April 2016. Crest Issuant from a tower Or a demi-horse Sable gorged of the chain of office of the Usher of the Black Rod of the Senate of Canada and holding the Black Rod of the Senate of Canada Proper. Escutcheon Gyronny Argent and Sable a saltire of eight points quarter-pierced per saltire quarterly Gules and Argent. Motto Pulsate Et Aperietur Vobis (Latin for 'Knock And The Door Will Be Opened For You') |

== See also ==
- Black Rod
- Usher of the Black Rod (Canada)

Parliament of Canada
| Preceded by Blair Armitage (Acting) | Usher of the Black Rod; October 1, 2013 – | Succeeded by Incumbent |
