= David E. Smith (political scientist) =

Political scientist

David E. Smith (1936–2023) was a distinguished Canadian scholar of political science and decorated Department of Political Studies professor at the University of Saskatchewan. He is author of Canada’s Deep Crown: Beyond Elizabeth II, The Crown’s Continuing Canadian Complexion; Federalism and the Constitution of Canada; The People's House of Commons; and, The Canadian Senate in Bicameral Perspective.
