= Usher of the Black Rod (Canada) =

Officer of the Senate of Canada

- Huissier du bâton noir
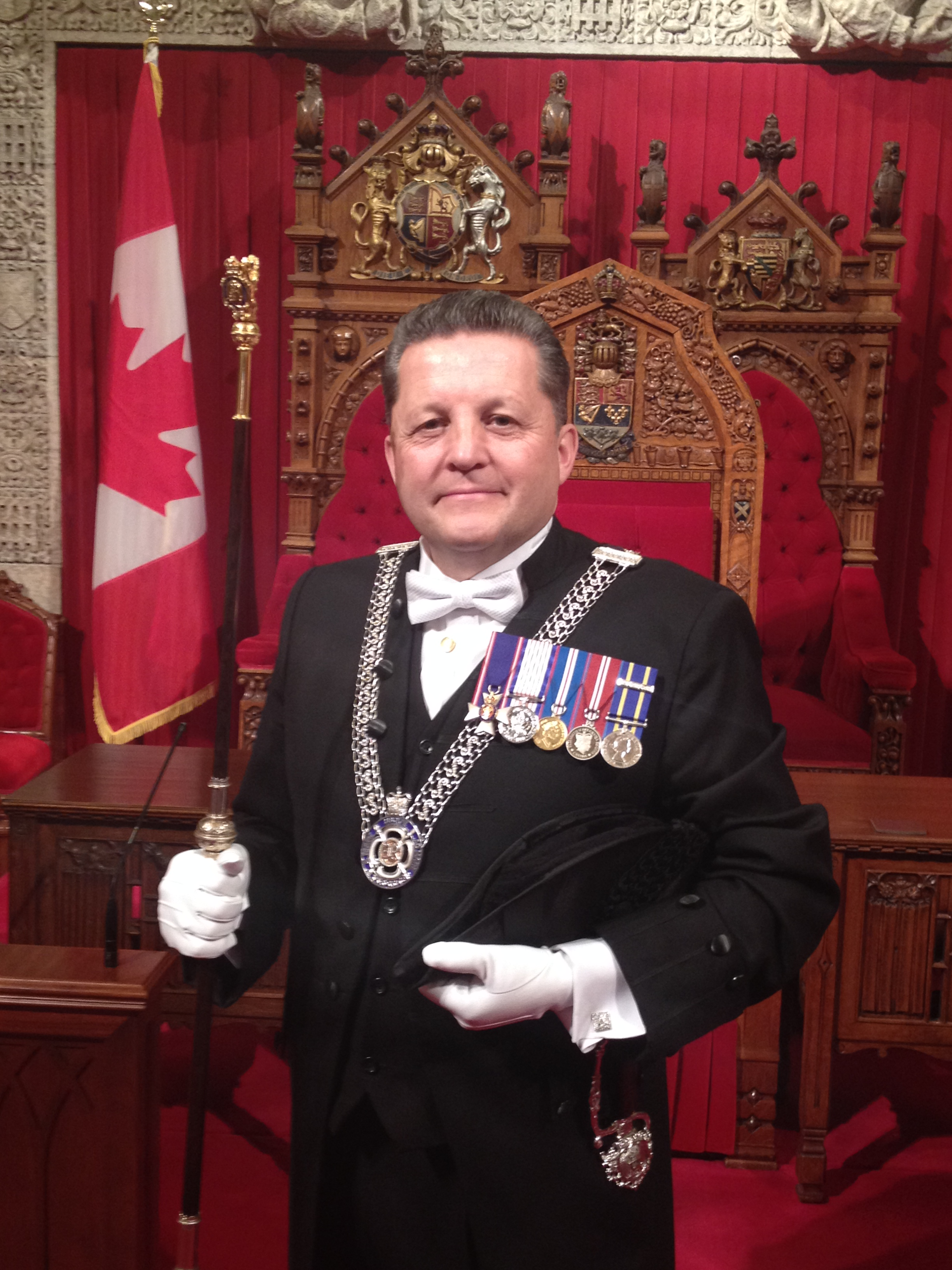
- Incumbent; J. Greg Peters since 1 October 2013
- Parliament of Canada
- Appointer: Governor General in Council
- Formation: 1867
- First holder: René Kimber
- Website: sencanada.ca/en/about/usher-black-rod/

The Usher of the Black Rod (French: Huissier du bâton noir), formerly known as Gentleman Usher of the Black Rod (French: Gentilhomme huissier de la verge noire) also often shortened to Black Rod is the most senior protocol position in the Parliament of Canada. Black Rod leads the Speaker's Parade at the beginning of each sitting of the Senate and oversees protocol and administrative and logistical details of important events taking place on Parliament Hill, such as the opening of parliament and the Speech from the Throne.

The office is modelled on the Gentleman Usher of the Black Rod of the House of Lords in the Parliament of the United Kingdom. Upon the appointment of the first woman to the position of Gentleman Usher of the Black Rod on 20 October 1997, the title was changed to Usher of the Black Rod.

The current Usher of the Black Rod is J. Greg Peters. On 12 March 2025, Peters was received by The King, where he was bestowed a new ceremonial sword.

== The rod ==
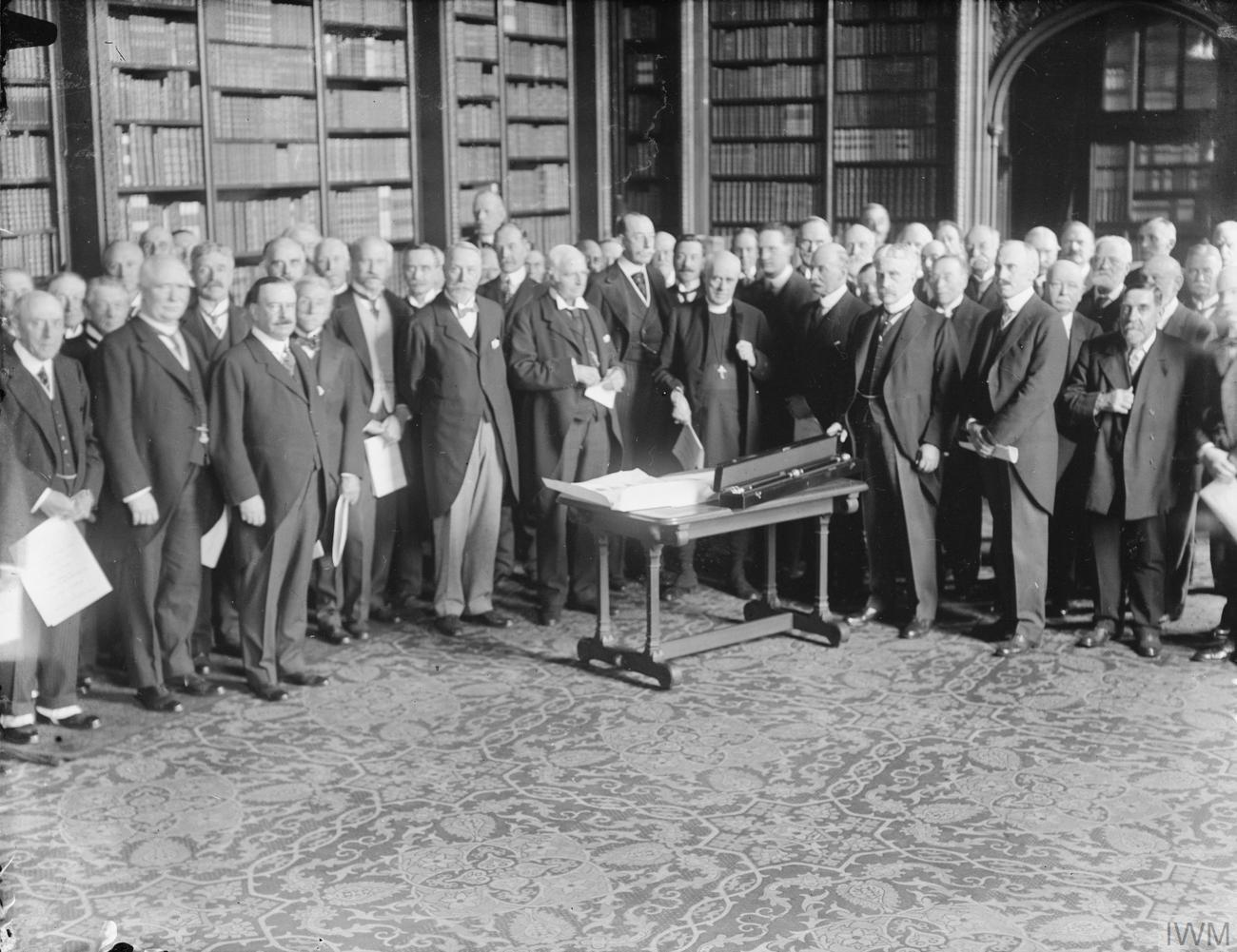
The rod being presented to Robert Laird Borden in the House of Lords Library, June 1918

The usher carries an ebony and gold staff of office modelled on that used in the House of Lords. Canada's original rod is believed to have been made in the 1840s in Montreal for the Legislative Assembly of the Province of Canada, and then transferred to the Senate after Confederation in 1867. Still, it was lost in the 1916 fire that destroyed Centre Block. The current rod was crafted the same year by then-Crown Jeweller Garrard & Co.

The rod was snapped in half in 1967, and underwent only amateur repairs at the hands of Senator Henry Davies Hicks in his personal workshop; over the years it has additionally suffered scratching, cracking, and loss of pieces. Accordingly, on the occasion of the 150th anniversary of Canada in 2016, the Queen bestowed a restoration by artisans and craftspeople at Windsor Castle under the direction of Adrian Smith, L.V.O., which replaced the central ebony rod itself with a 20th-century ebony walking cane.

The top consists of a lion on its hind legs displaying a shield decorated with the royal cypher of George V of the United Kingdom, the monarch when the rod was crafted, and bearing the motto Honi soit qui mal y pense. Its middle knob is made of silver with maple leaf engravings (in contrast to the oak leaves used in its UK counterpart, which is made of gold). It is engraved with the name of Queen Elizabeth II, inscribed during its restoration. The base is set with a 1904 gold sovereign, displaying St. George slaying the Dragon.

== Trappings of office ==
Beyond the rod, the Usher holds several other trappings of office. These include:

- Ceremonial sword
- Legal court dress uniform, which includes a black tailcoat, white bow tie, and a bicorne hat
- Chain of office

== List of office holders ==
From 1867 to 1997, the title of the office was Gentleman Usher of the Black Rod. After the first female (Mary C. McLaren) was appointed to the position, the term gentleman was dropped from the title.

#	Name	Start date	End date
1	René Kimber	November 2, 1867	June 4, 1875
2	René Edouard Kimber (Son of René Kimber)	June 4, 1875	August 16, 1901
3	Molyneux St. John	January 31, 1902	January 30, 1904
4	Ernest John Chambers	March 1, 1904	June 1925
5	Andrew Ruthven Thompson	June 1925	1946
6	Charles Rock Lamoureux	January 15, 1947	October 1970
7	A. Guy Vandelac	November 1, 1970	September 1979
8	Thomas Guy Bowie	September 26, 1979	1984
9	Claude G. Lajoie	July 9, 1984	July 1985
10	René Marc Jalbert	July 10, 1985	March 6, 1989
11	Rene Gutknecht	March 6, 1989	October 1990
12	Jean Doré	October 1990	June 28, 1997
13	Mary C. McLaren	October 20, 1997	September 14, 2001
14	Terrance Christopher	December 9, 2002	March 7, 2008
15	Kevin S. MacLeod	May 26, 2008	September 30, 2013
16	J. Greg Peters	October 1, 2013	present

== See also ==
- Procedural officers and senior officials of the Parliament of Canada
