= 1st Cavalry Division Horse Cavalry Detachment =

Ceremonial horse cavalry unit of the 1st Cavalry Division, US Army

Horse Cavalry Detachment, 1st Cavalry Division
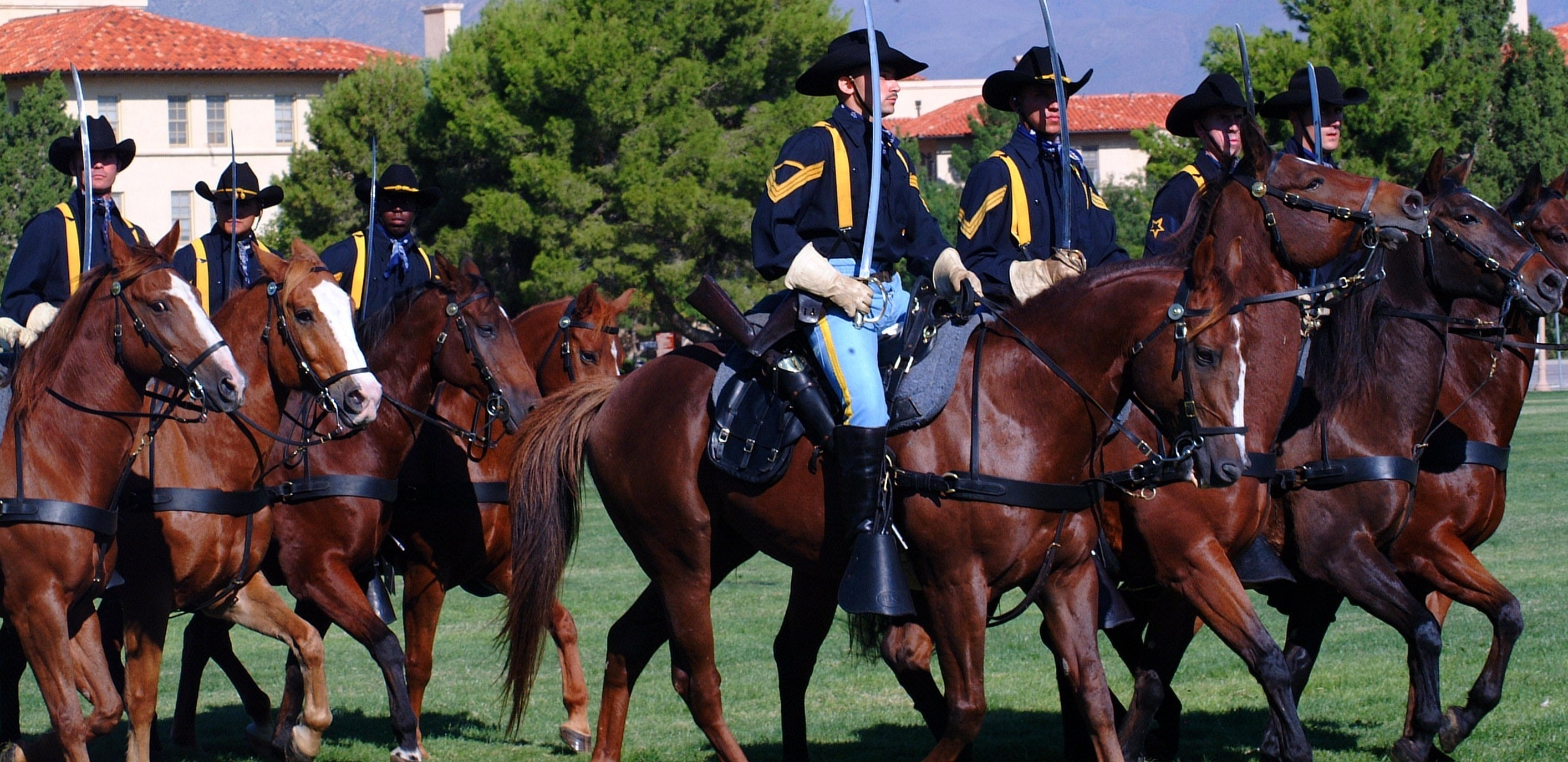
- Active: 1972 – Present
- Country: United States
- Branch: United States Army
- Type: Cavalry
- Role: Public Duties
- Size: 40
- Part of: 1st Cavalry Division
- Garrison/HQ: Fort Hood
- Nickname: Horse Cavalry Detachment
- Motto: "Hot to Trot!"
- Mascot: Doc Holliday (dog)

Commanders
- Current commander: CPT Megan Korpiel
- First Sergeant: 1SG Jim Hendrix

The Horse Cavalry Detachment, 1st Cavalry Division is an equestrian military unit of the United States Army. Posted at Fort Hood, Texas, it was activated in 1972 and is a subordinate unit of the 1st Cavalry Division.

== History ==
In 1943, at the height of World War II, the 1st Cavalry Division disposed of its remaining horses. The Horse Cavalry Detachment was activated 29 years later, in 1972. In 2014 the first woman to lead the detachment, Captain Elizabeth R. Rascon, assumed command.

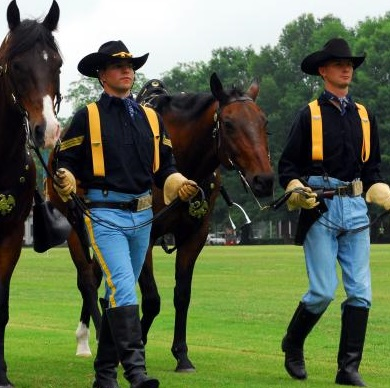
Soldiers of the Horse Cavalry Detachment pictured in 2010.

It was one of seven horse-mounted units remaining in the U.S. Army. On 2 July 2025 the Army announced that the Military Working Equid program that includes the 1st Cavalry Division Horse Cavalry Detachment will cease operations and associated assets (MWEs) will be transferred, adopted, or donated within one year. The Army stated "This initiative will save the Army $2 million annually and will allow the funds and Soldiers dedicated to MWE programs to be redirected to readiness and warfighting priorities." In December, the Army announced that this Military Working Equid program will remain active along with the one at Fort Riley.

== Mission ==
The mission of the Horse Cavalry Detachment is to support the 1st Cavalry Division and Fort Hood by participating in ceremonies and other events; to support the U.S. Army in its public relations and recruiting efforts; and to preserve and maintain the standards of drill and traditions of the U.S. Cavalry during the 1800's.

The detachment primarily performs public duties functions. The unit participates in change of command and medal ceremonies, the U.S. presidential inauguration, and represents the 1st Cavalry Division and the U.S. Army in parades, riding demonstrations, and civic events. In addition to official state and military ceremonies, it has participated in the Rose Parade, Professional Rodeo Cowboys Association rodeos, and U.S. Army recruiting events. Finally, a weekly mounted drill demonstrating equestrian vaulting and cavalry tactics, such as sabre charges, is held for the public by the detachment every Thursday morning at Fort Hood.

The Horse Cavalry Detachment's mounted drills are drawn from the U.S. Army's 1883 Manual of Cavalry Tactics.

A Horse Cavalry Detachment trooper demonstrates equestrian vaulting in 2013.

== Equipment ==
=== Armaments and vehicles ===
The 40-soldier unit is equipped with 33 dark bay horses with minimal white markings which are outfitted with Model 1885 McClellan riding saddles that are hand-made by cavalry troopers in an on-site leather shop maintained at the unit's stables. Each of the unit's mounts are trained for approximately one year before being put into action. It additionally deploys 4 mules, a mascot dog (Doc Holliday), a Model 1878 supply wagon, and a M1841 Light Mountain Howitzer. Individual soldiers are equipped with the 1873 Springfield Carbine Trap Door (Breech Lock) Model Caliber 45-70, 1873 Colt Single Action Caliber .45 Revolver, and the 1860 Light Cavalry Saber.

=== Uniforms ===
The Horse Cavalry Detachment is designated by the U.S. Army as a "special ceremonial unit" which allows it to wear specialized, unit-specific uniforms not part of standard Army issue.

== See also ==
- Musical Ride (a Royal Canadian Mounted Police equestrian drill)
- United States Cavalry
