= Terrance Christopher =

Canadian civil servant

Terrance Christopher, OMM, LVO, CD is a retired Canadian Naval Officer and former Usher of the Black Rod for the Senate of Canada, the most senior protocol office in Parliament.

Born in Cape Breton, Nova Scotia, Christopher graduated from St. Francis Xavier University and the Maritime School of Social Work before joining the Royal Canadian Navy rising to the rank of Lieutenant-Commander. He served on HMCS Stadacona, HMCS Cornwallis, CFB Borden and at NATO. His naval service is most notable for his work on expanding education and training services in the navy. Retiring in 1994, he briefly entered the private sector before becoming head of the Canadian government's VIP reception services.

He became Usher of the Black Rod on December 9, 2002, and his term expired on March 8, 2008, after having been extended for three months to allow the government to find a new Usher.

He was appointed an Officer of the Order of Military Merit in 1982. In 1994, he was made a Lieutenant of the Royal Victorian Order.
