= Spinney =

Spinney may refer to:

- A copse or thicket

== People ==
- Art Spinney (1927–1994), American football guard
- Caroll Spinney (1933–2019), American puppeteer and cartoonist
- Edgar Keith Spinney, (1851–1926), Canadian politician
- Franklin C. Spinney (born 1945), American military analyst, author of the "Spinney Report"
- George Wilbur Spinney (1889–1948), president of Bank of Montreal

== Places ==
- Spinney (Kettering BC Ward), an electoral ward in Northamptonshire, England
- Spinney Abbey, a former monastery in Cambridgeshire, England
- Spinney Hill, an area of Northampton, England
- Spinney Hills, an area of Leicester, England
- Spinney Hills, East Quogue, a leisure area in New York state
- Spinney Mountain State Park, a state park in Colorado
- The Spinney Local Nature Reserve, a reserve in Carshalton, London
- Round Spinney, a locality in Northampton, England

== Other uses ==
- Spinneys, a supermarket chain
- Empire Spinney, a ship built in 1941

== See also ==
- Spiny (disambiguation)
