= Śmiłowice =

Śmiłowice may refer to:

- Polish name for Smilovice (Frýdek-Místek District) in the Czech Republic
- Śmiłowice, Kuyavian-Pomeranian Voivodeship (north-central Poland)
- Śmiłowice, Lesser Poland Voivodeship (south Poland)
- Śmiłowice, Opole Voivodeship (south-west Poland)
- Śmiłowice, Mikołów in Silesian Voivodeship (south Poland)

== See also ==
- Smilovice (disambiguation)
