= Frączków =

- Village
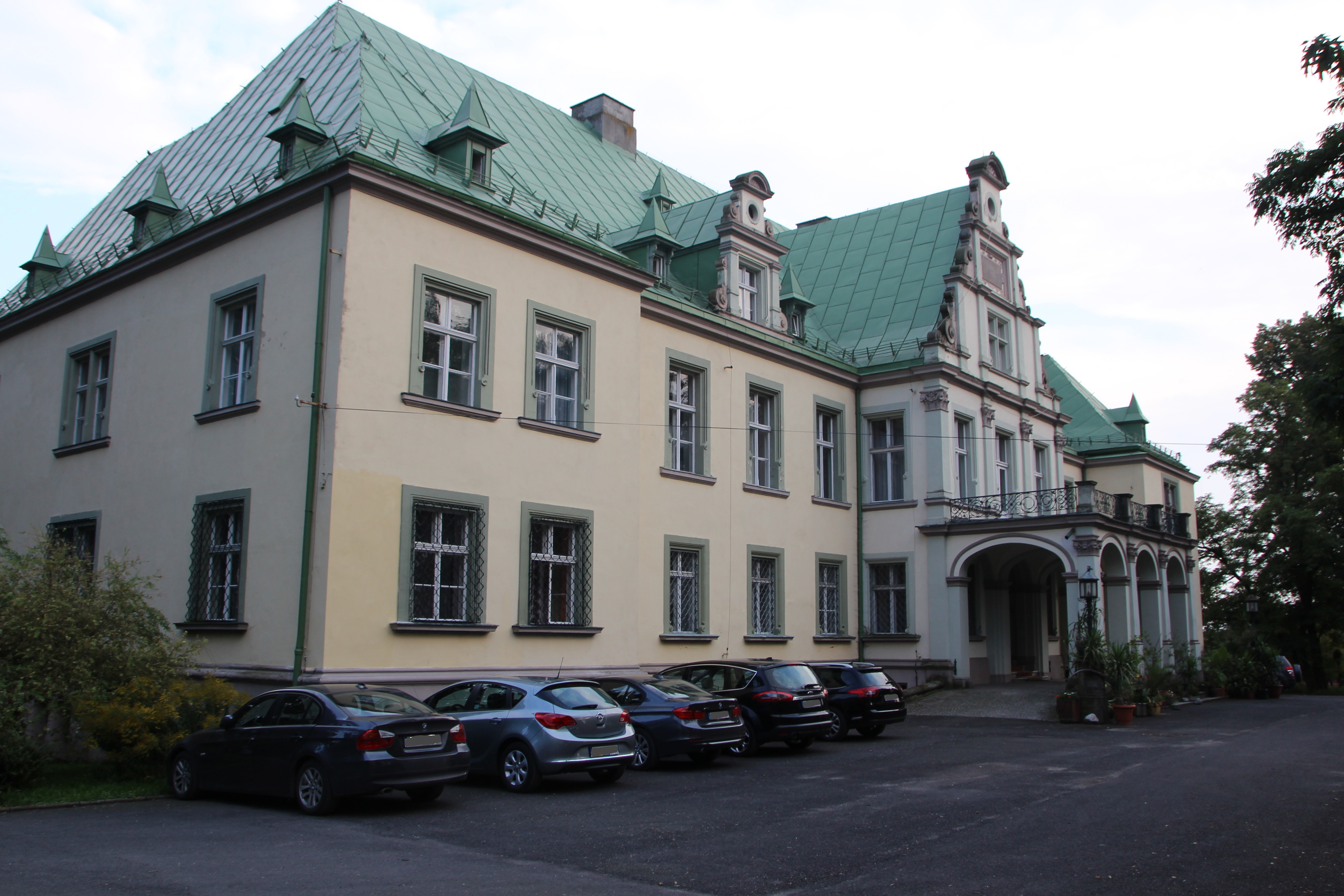
- Palace in the village

- Location within Poland
- Coordinates: 50°32′18″N 17°18′37″E
- Country: Poland
- Voivodeship: Opole
- County: Nysa
- Gmina: Pakosławice

Frączków [ˈfrɔnt͡ʂkuf] (German: Franzdorf) is a village in the administrative district of Gmina Pakosławice, within Nysa County, Opole Voivodeship, in south-western Poland.
