= Nowaki, Opole Voivodeship =

Nowaki
- Village
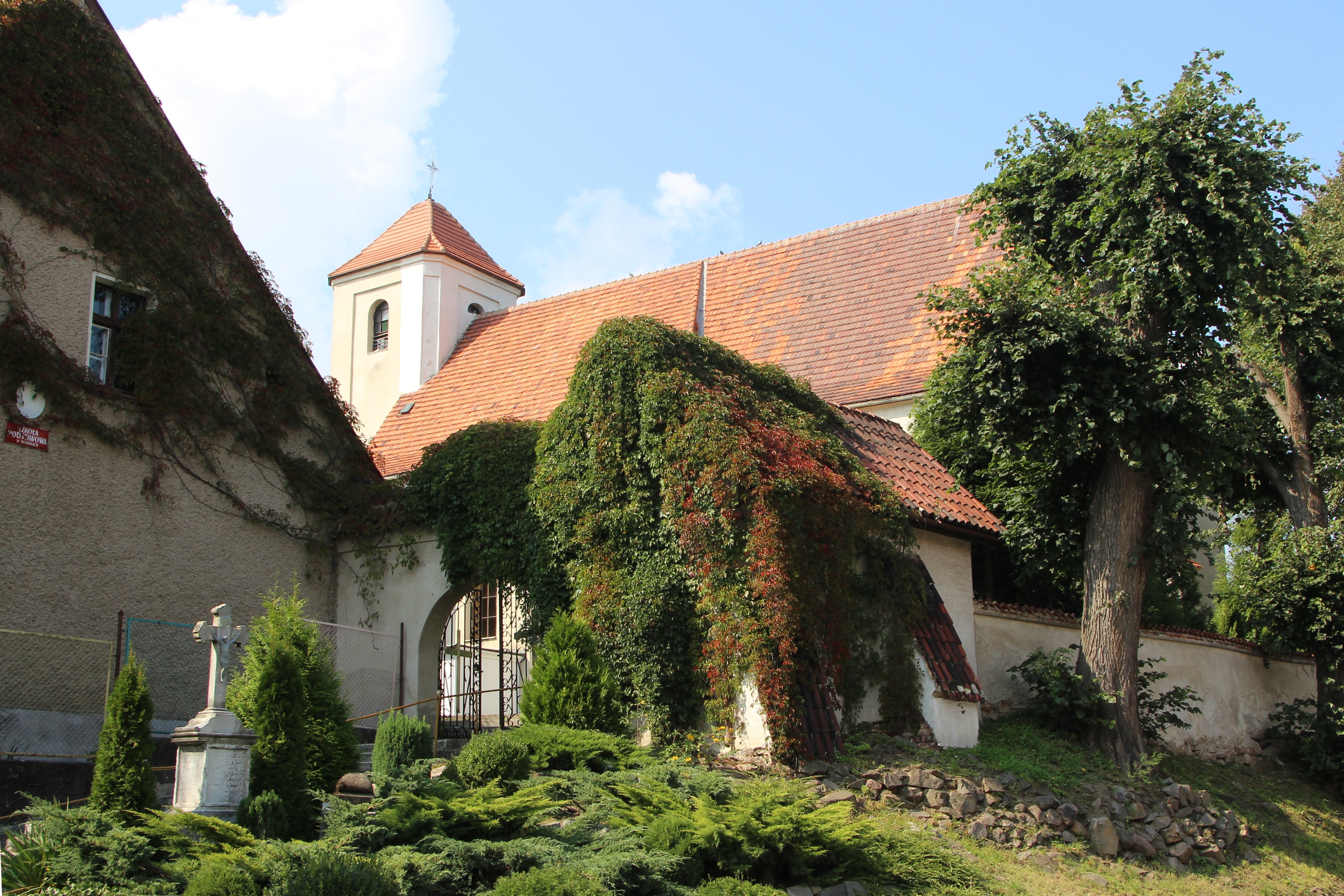
- Catholic church

- Location within Poland
- Coordinates: 50°32′N 17°16′E
- Country: Poland
- Voivodeship: Opole
- County: Nysa
- Gmina: Pakosławice

Nowaki [nɔˈvaki] (German: Nowag) is a village in the administrative district of Gmina Pakosławice, within Nysa County, Opole Voivodeship, in south-western Poland.
