= James Elliott Coyne =

2nd governor of the Bank of Canada

James Coyne OM
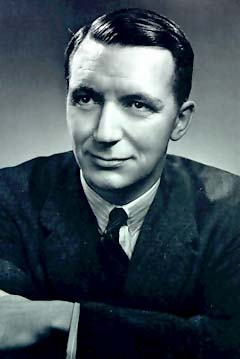
- Coyne c. 1960

2nd Governor of the Bank of Canada
- In office January 1, 1955 – July 13, 1961
- Preceded by: Graham Towers
- Succeeded by: Louis Rasminsky

Personal details
- Born: James Elliott Coyne; July 17, 1910 Winnipeg, Manitoba, Canada
- Died: October 12, 2012 (aged 102) Winnipeg, Manitoba, Canada
- Children: 5, including Susan and Andrew Coyne
- Parent: James Bowes Coyne (father)
- Relatives: James Henry Coyne (grandfather); Deborah Coyne (niece)

James Elliott Coyne OM (July 17, 1910 – October 12, 2012) was a Canadian economist who served as the second governor of the Bank of Canada, from 1955 to 1961, succeeding Graham Towers. During his time in office, he had a much-publicized debate with Prime Minister John Diefenbaker, a debate often referred to as the "Coyne Affair" (or sometimes the "Coyne Crisis"), which led to his resignation and, eventually, to greater central-bank independence in Canada.

== Life and career ==
Coyne was born in Winnipeg, Manitoba, the son of Edna Margaret (née Elliott) and James Bowes Coyne, a judge at the Manitoba Court of Appeal, who was co-prosecutor of the men accused of seditious conspiracy in the Winnipeg General Strike of 1919. His grandfather was lawyer and historian James Henry Coyne. Coyne graduated from Ridley College in St. Catharines, Ontario in 1925, and had conferred upon him a BA in 1931 from the University of Manitoba. He studied at Oxford University as a Rhodes Scholar, playing for the Oxford University Ice Hockey Club, and in 1934 received a B.A. Jurisprudence and BCL. During World War II, he served in the Royal Canadian Air Force.

From 1944 to 1949, Coyne was executive assistant to Graham Towers at the Bank of Canada and from 1950 until 1954 was Deputy Governor. He was appointed Governor in 1955, resigned in 1961, and was succeeded by Louis Rasminsky.

He was the father of journalist Andrew Coyne and actress and playwright Susan Coyne, and stepfather of Sanford Riley, Patrick Riley and Nancy Riley. He was also an uncle of constitutional lawyer Deborah Coyne.

=== The Coyne Affair ===
The Coyne Affair, or the Coyne Crisis, was a public disagreement between Coyne, the Governor of the Bank of Canada, and the Progressive Conservative (PC) government of John Diefenbaker, notably Donald Fleming, the Minister of Finance.

As Governor, Coyne heavily criticized the government's fiscal policies, which saw the Diefenbaker government spend and borrow heavily in an effort to stimulate growth amid a flagging economy. Government officials urged Coyne to lower interest rates and create economic activity. Coyne disagreed, arguing that loose money policies were creating a debt crisis and that Canada was relying too much on capital exports and loans from the United States, and thus a tightening was needed instead. In speeches and brochures, he criticized the government's expansionary policies. The government took the position that an elected government, especially one elected with a large mandate, should direct monetary policy.

Matters came to a head when Coyne raised his own pension to $25,000, which Diefenbaker deemed excessive when he himself had no entitlement to one. The PC majority in the House of Commons passed a bill declaring his position vacant, but the Liberal-controlled Senate rejected it. Nevertheless, Coyne resigned the next day. For his role in this controversy, the Canadian Press named him Canadian Newsmaker of the Year in 1961.

== Honours ==
- He was given the Honorary degree of Doctor of Laws from the University of Manitoba in 1961.
- He was awarded the Canadian version of the Queen Elizabeth II Diamond Jubilee Medal in 2012
- He was appointed a member of the Order of Manitoba in 2012. Coyne died in Winnipeg on October 12, 2012.
