= Smolice, Opole Voivodeship =

Smolice
- Village
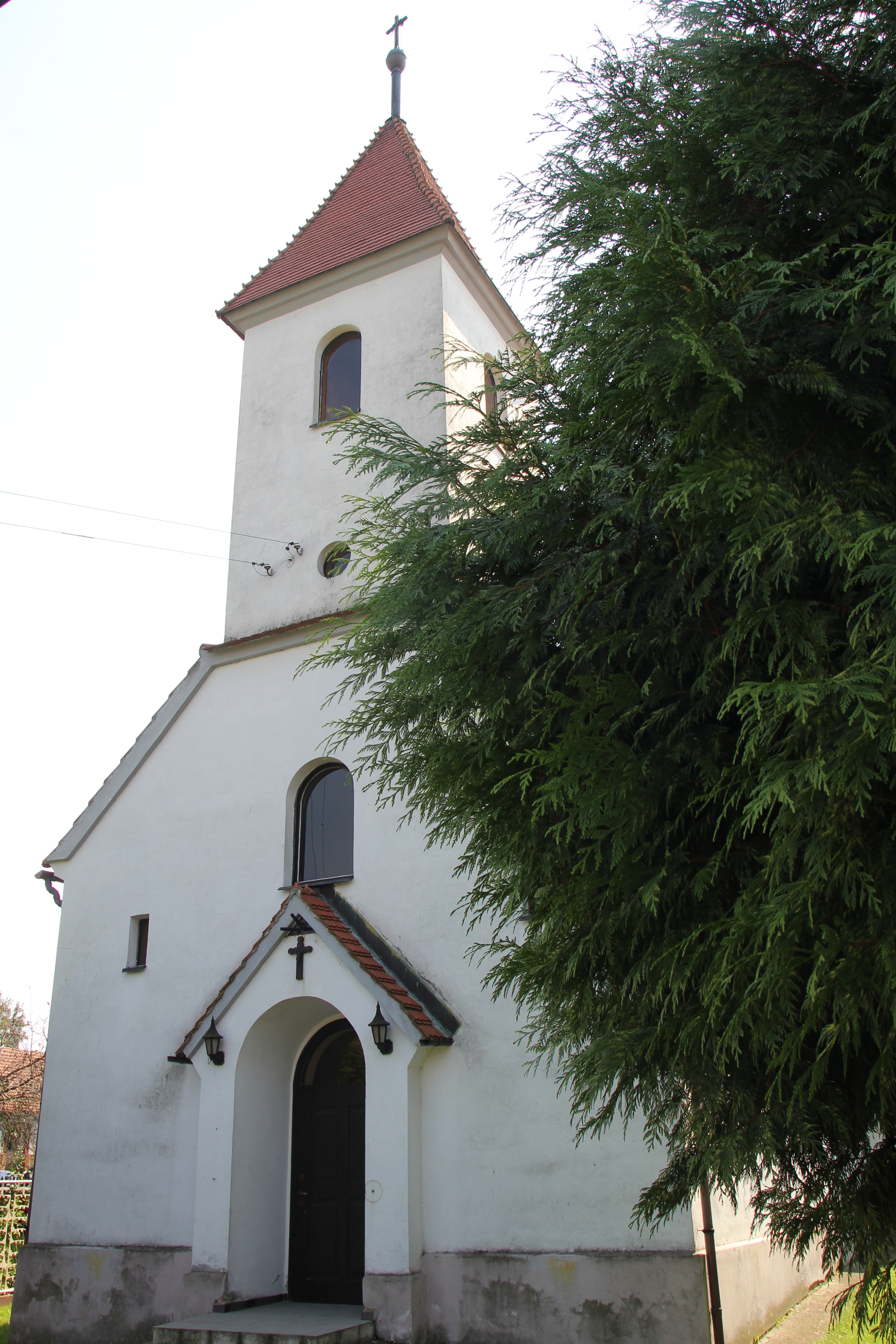
- Chapel in Smolice

- Location within Poland
- Coordinates: 50°33′13″N 17°16′36″E
- Country: Poland
- Voivodeship: Opole
- County: Nysa
- Gmina: Pakosławice

Smolice [smɔˈlit͡sɛ] (German: Schmolitz) is a village in the administrative district of Gmina Pakosławice, within Nysa County, Opole Voivodeship, in south-western Poland.
