= National War Finance Committee =

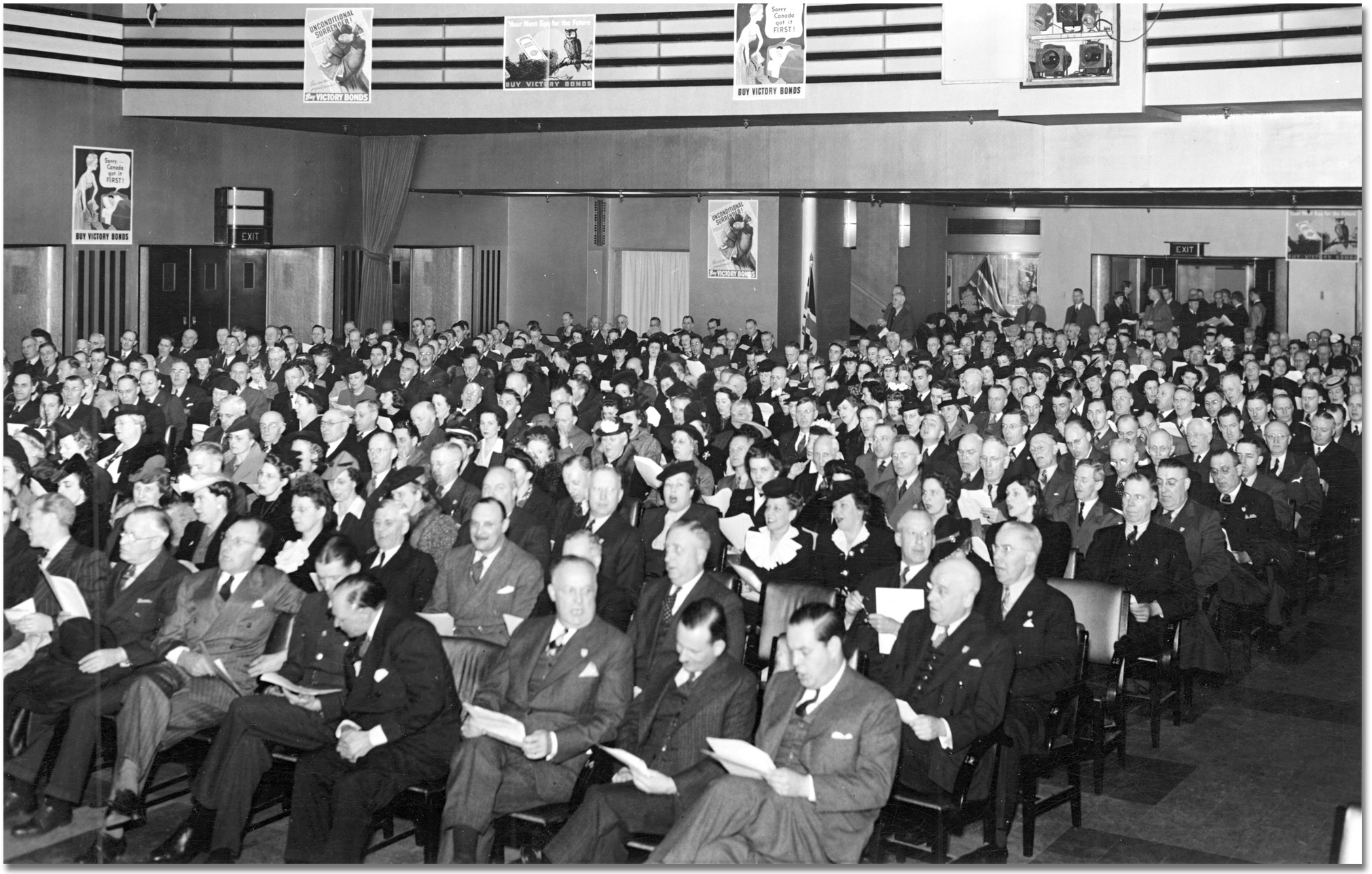
Victory Bonds rally, 1943

The National War Finance Committee was set up in Canada in December 1941 by the Department of Finance. It was initially chaired by George Wilbur Spinney, president of the Bank of Montreal, and later by Graham Towers, the Governor of the Bank of Canada. The Committee was responsible for raising war financing through the sale of Victory Bonds. Prior to the Committee's establishment, war financing was the responsibility of the Department of Finance.
