= James Henry Coyne =

Canadian lawyer and historian

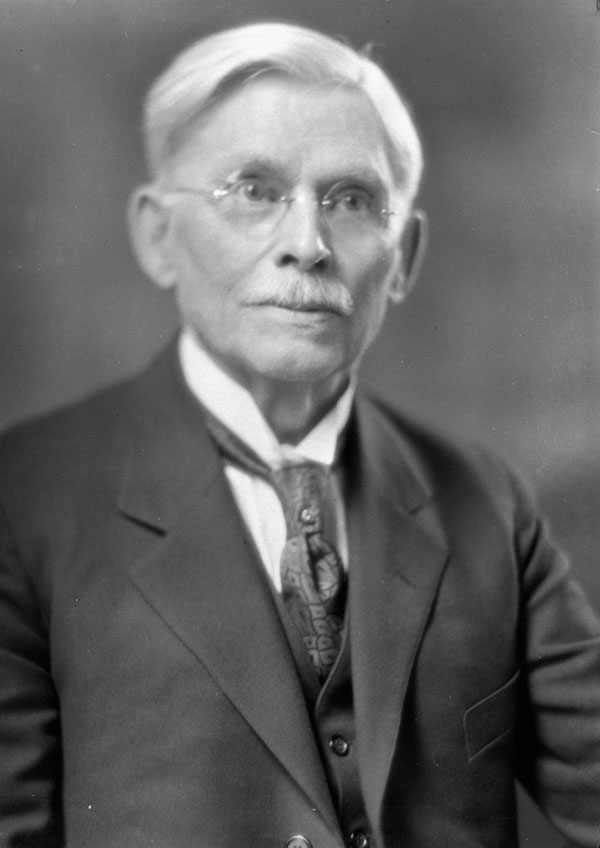
- Born: October 3, 1849; St. Thomas, Canada West
- Died: January 5, 1942 (aged 92); St. Thomas, Ontario
- Occupations: Lawyer, historian
- Spouse: Matilda Bowes
- Children: at least 4
- Relatives: James Elliott Coyne (grandson); Andrew Coyne (great-grandson); Susan Coyne (great-granddaughter)

James Henry Coyne, FRSC (October 3, 1849 – January 5, 1942) was a Canadian lawyer and historian.

== Life and career ==
Born in St. Thomas, Canada West (now Ontario), the second son of William Coyne and Christina Patterson, Coyne graduated from University College, Toronto in 1870. He studied law in St. Thomas and was called to the Ontario Bar in 1874. He practiced law in St. Thomas.

During the Fenian raids of 1866, Coyne joined the St. Thomas Rifles (or 1st Volunteer Militia Rifle Company at St. Thomas, which formed part of the 25th Elgin Battalion of Infantry (mentioned at Elgin Regiment) and served in three campaigns in London, Port Stanley, and Sarnia. He acted as quartermaster-sergeant to the Provisional battalion of volunteers in Thorold. In 1877, he joined the University company of the Queen's Own Rifles, where he remained a member until his graduation in 1870.

From 1898 to 1902, he was President of the Ontario Historical Society and was a member of the Historic Sites and Monuments Board of Canada from 1919 to 1930.

In 1906 he was made a Fellow of the Royal Society of Canada and served as its president from 1926 to 1927.

He married Matilda Bowes in 1877 and had at least four children. His son, James Bowes Coyne, was a lawyer and judge in Manitoba. James Bowes Coyne's son, James Elliott Coyne, was the second Governor of the Bank of Canada. Op-ed writer Andrew Coyne is a great-grandson.

== Works ==
- The Country Of The Neutrals. St. Thomas, Ontario: Times Print. 1895.
- Doughty, Arthur G.; Shortt, Adam., eds. (1914). "The Pathfinders of the Great Lakes". Canada and its Provinces: A History of the Canadian People and their Institutions by One Hundred Associates. Vol. 1. Toronto: Glasgow, Brook & Company. pp. 45–110.
- Richard Maurice Burke. 1923.

Professional and academic associations
Preceded by William Parks	President of the Royal Society of Canada; 1926–1927	Succeeded by Arthur Henry Reginald Buller
