= Radowice, Opole Voivodeship =

Radowice
- Village
- Location within Poland
- Coordinates: 50°34′N 17°15′E
- Country: Poland
- Voivodeship: Opole
- County: Nysa
- Gmina: Pakosławice

Radowice [radɔˈvit͡sɛ] (German: Rottwitz) is a village in the administrative district of Gmina Pakosławice, within Nysa County, Opole Voivodeship, in south-western Poland.
