= War bond =

Government debt security issued to finance wartime expenditure

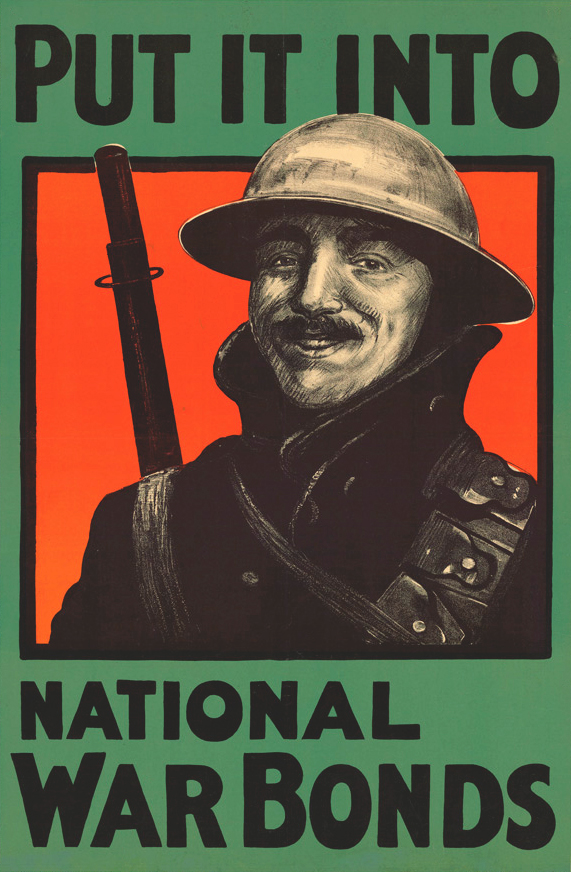
United Kingdom national war bond advertisement (1918)

War bonds (sometimes referred to as victory bonds, particularly in propaganda) are debt securities issued by a government to finance military operations and other expenditure in times of war without raising taxes to an unpopular level. They are also a means to control inflation by removing money from circulation in a stimulated wartime economy. War bonds are either retail bonds marketed directly to the public or wholesale bonds traded on a stock market. Exhortations to buy war bonds have often been accompanied by appeals to patriotism and conscience. Retail war bonds, like other retail bonds, tend to have a yield which is below that offered by the market and are often made available in a wide range of denominations to make them affordable for all citizens.

== Before World War I ==
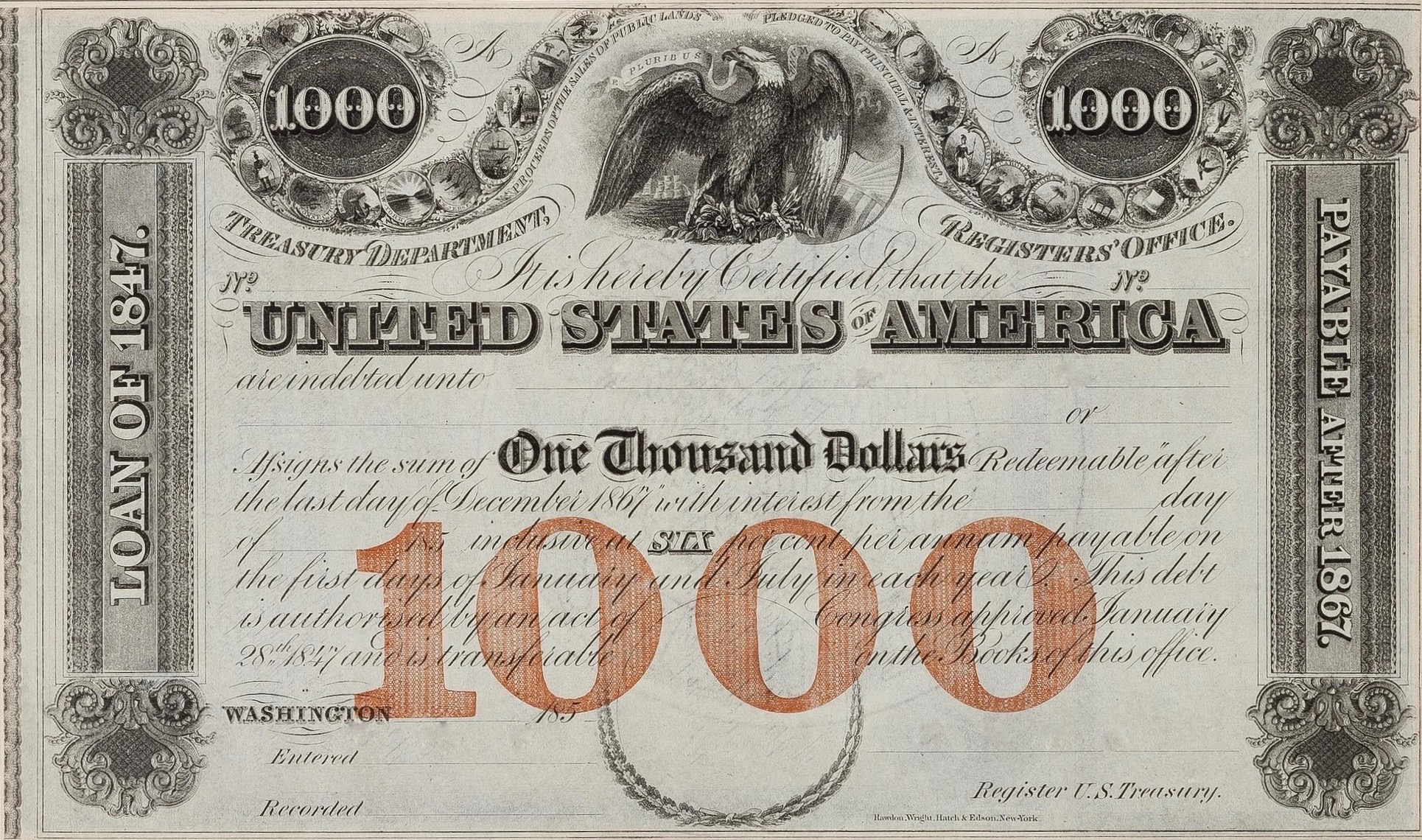
$1000 U.S. government loan for the Mexican–American War

Governments throughout history have needed to borrow money to fight wars. Traditionally they dealt with a small group of rich financiers such as Jakob Fugger and Nathan Rothschild, but no particular distinction was made between debt incurred in war or peace. An early use of the term "war bond" was for the $11 million raised by the US Congress in an Act of 14 March 1812, to fund the War of 1812, but this was not aimed at the general public. Until July 2015, perhaps the oldest bonds still outstanding as a result of war were the British Consols, some of which were the result of the refinancing of incurring debts during the Napoleonic Wars, but these were redeemed following the passing of the Finance Act 2015.

== World War I ==
=== Austria and Hungary ===
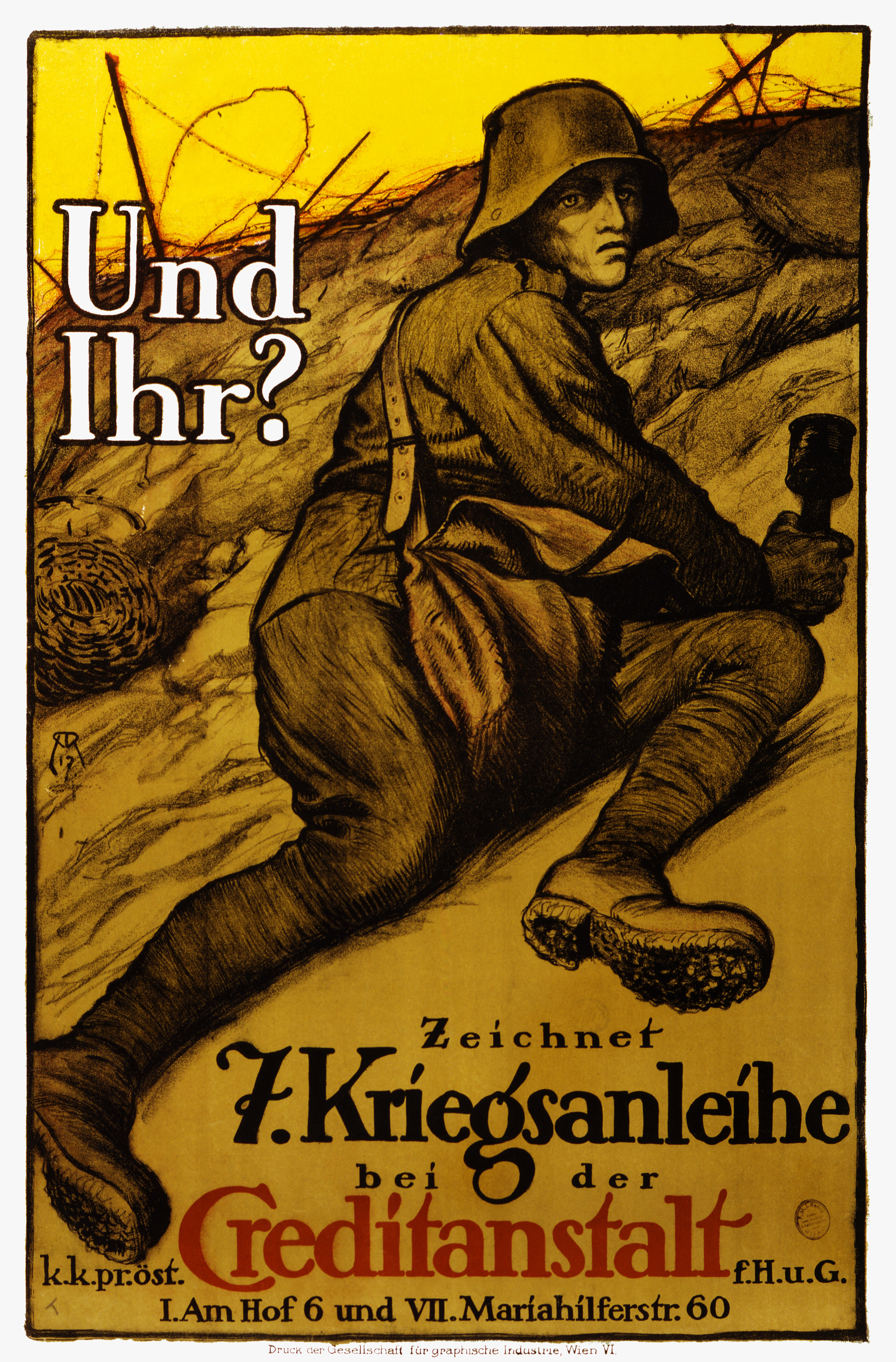
"And You?" Austrian poster promoting war bonds (1917)

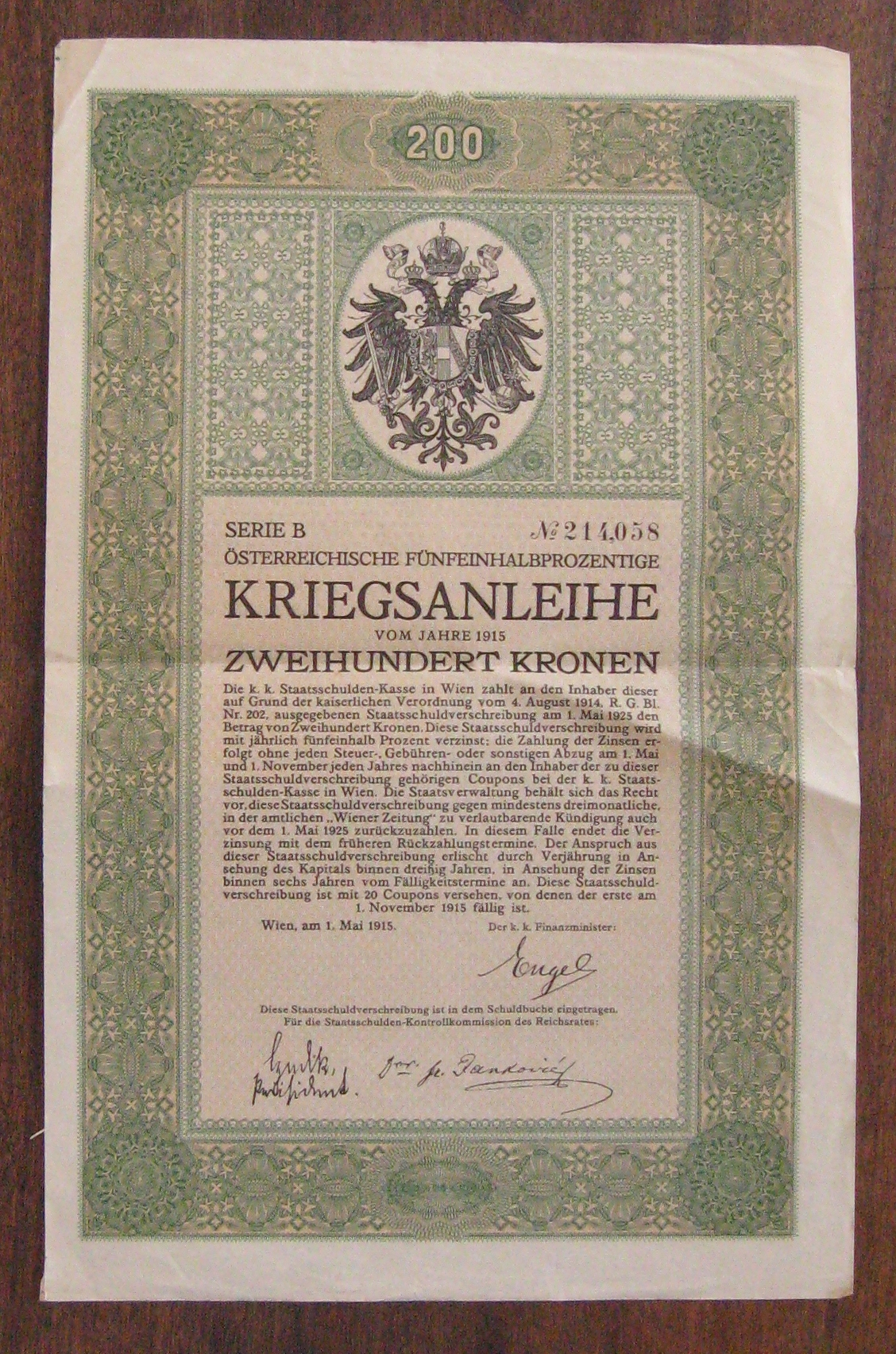
An Austrian war bond (1915)

The government of Austria-Hungary knew from the early days of the First World War that it could not count on advances from its principal banking institutions to meet the growing costs of the war. Instead, it implemented a war finance policy modeled upon that of Germany: in November 1914, the first funded loan was issued. As in Germany, the Austro-Hungarian loans followed a prearranged plan and were issued at half yearly intervals every November and May. The first Austrian bonds paid 5% interest and had a five-year term. The smallest bond denomination available was 100 kronen.

Hungary issued loans separately from Austria in 1919, after the war and after it had separated from Austria, in the form of stocks that permitted the subscriber to demand repayment after a year's notice. Interest was fixed at 6%, and the smallest denomination was 50 korona. Subscriptions to the first Austrian bond issue amounted to $440 million; those of the first Hungarian issue amounted to $235 million.

The limited financial resources of children were tapped through campaigns in schools. The initial minimum Austrian bond denomination of 100 kronen still exceeded the means of most children, so the third bond issue, in 1915, introduced a scheme whereby children could donate a small amount and take out a bank loan to cover the rest of the 100 kronen. The initiative was immensely successful, eliciting funds and encouraging loyalty to the state and its future among Austro-Hungarian youth. Over 13 million kronen was collected in the first three "child bond" issues.

=== Canada ===
Fifth victory loan flag (1918). The organisation/ community that was issued this flag raised 175% over their fundraising goal, as indicated by the seven additional crowns.

Sixth victory loan flag (1919). The organisation/ community that was issued this flag raised 100% over their fundraising goal, as indicated by the four additional feather badges.

Canada's involvement in the First World War began in 1914, with Canadian war bonds called "victory bonds" after 1917. The first domestic war loan was raised in November 1915, but not until the fourth campaign of November 1917 was the term victory loan applied. The first victory loan was a 5.5% issue of 5, 10 and 20 year gold bonds in denominations as small as $50. It was quickly oversubscribed, collecting $398 million or about $50 per capita. The second and third victory loans were floated in 1918 and 1919, bringing another $1.34 billion. For those who could not afford to buy victory bonds, the government also issued war savings certificates.

The government awarded communities who bought large amounts of bonds victory loan honour flags. The first campaign to be issued a flag as a prize was the fifth campaign in 1918. It featured a white field within a red border and bore five diagonal blue stripes in the canton representing the fifth campaign. The fly featured the 1907 variant of the Royal Canadian Coat of Arms quartered with all nine provincial arms. A crown was awarded for every additional 25% raised over the initial fundraising goal.

The sixth campaign's flag in 1919 saw the Union Flag replace the diagonal stripes. The flag coincided with the then Prince of Wales, Edward VIII's visit to Canada. With the Prince's permission, his coat of arms were featured on the arms, though interestingly, the version of the arms that was selected was the pre-1910 version of the arms, and was no longer actually used by the Prince. Like the fifth campaign, for every additional 25% raised, a feather badge was awarded to be sewn on the flag.

=== Germany ===
German war bonds by Lucian Bernhard

Unlike France and Britain, at the outbreak of the First World War Germany found itself largely excluded from international financial markets. This became most apparent after an attempt to float a major loan on Wall Street failed in 1914. As such, Germany was largely limited to domestic borrowing, which was induced by a series of war credit bills passing the Reichstag. This took place in many forms; however, the most publicised were the public war bond (Kriegsanleihe) drives.

Nine bond drives were conducted over the length of the war and, as in Austria-Hungary, the loans were issued at six-month intervals. The drives themselves would often last several weeks, during which there was extensive use of propaganda via all possible media. Most bonds had a rate of return of 5% and were redeemable over a ten-year period, in semi-annual payments. Like war bonds in other countries, the German war bonds drives were designed to be extravagant displays of patriotism and the bonds were sold through banks, post offices and other financial institutions.

As in other countries, the majority investors were not individuals but institutions and large corporations. Industries, university endowments, local banks and even city governments were the prime investors in the war bonds. In part because of intense public pressure and in part due to patriotic commitment the bond drives proved extremely successful, raising approximately 10 billion marks in funds. Although extremely successful the war bond drives only covered two-thirds of war-related expenditures. Meanwhile, the interest payable on the bonds represented a growing expense which required further resources to pay it.

=== United Kingdom ===
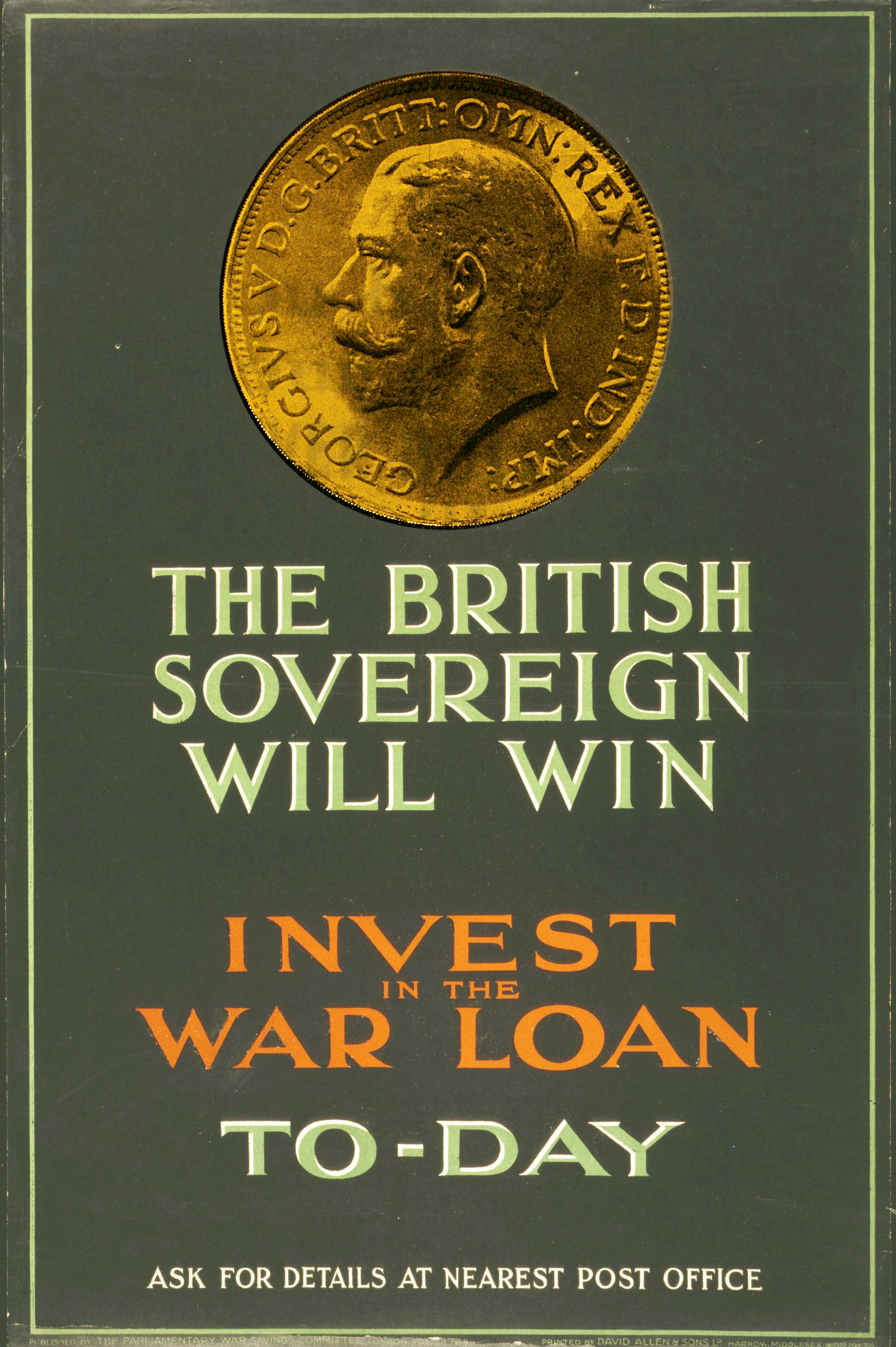
The British Sovereign Will Win / Invest in the War Loan To-Day. A British poster from World War One.

In August 1914, the gold reserves of the Bank of England, and effectively of all banking institutions in Great Britain, amounted to £9 million. The banks feared the declaration of war would trigger a run on the banks, so the Chancellor David Lloyd George extended the August bank holiday for three days to allow time for the passing of the Currency and Bank Notes Act 1914, by which Britain left the gold standard. Under this Act the Treasury issued £300 million (equivalent to £21.3 billion in 2013) of paper banknotes, without the backing of gold, with which the banks could repay their obligations. Leading banker Walter Leaf described these Treasury notes as "essentially a War Loan free of interest, for an unlimited period, and as such was a highly profitable expedient from the point of view of the Government".

The first interest-bearing War Loan was issued in November 1914 at an interest rate of 3.5%, to be redeemed at par value in 1925–28. It raised £333 million; £350 million at face value as it was issued at a 5% discount. It was revealed in 2017 that public subscriptions amounted to £91m, and the balance had been subscribed by the Bank of England, under the names of the then governor, John Gordon Nairne, and his deputy Ernest Harvey. It was followed by £901 million of a second War Loan in June 1915, at 4.5%. £17.6 million of this was accounted for by conversion of the 3.5% issue, and a further £138 million by holders of 2.5% and 2.75% Consols, who were also allowed to transfer to the higher interest rate. The government also pledged that if they issued War Loans at even higher interest, holders of the 4.5% bonds might also convert to the new rate. In his memoirs Lloyd George stated his regret that his successor Reginald McKenna increased the interest rate at a time when investors had few alternatives. Not only did it directly increase the nation's annual interest payments by £100 million but it meant interest rates were higher throughout the economy during the post-war depression.

Compared to France, the British government relied more on short-term financing in the form of treasury bills and exchequer bonds during World War I. Treasury bills provided the bulk of British government funds in 1916, and were available for terms of 3, 6, 9 and 12 months at an interest rate of 5%. Although these were not formally designated as war bonds, advertising was explicit about their purpose. This April 1916 advertisement for 5% Exchequer bonds was typical of the time: "Lend Your Money to Your Country. The soldier does not grudge offering his life to his country. He offers it freely, for his life may be the price of Victory. But Victory cannot be won without money as well as men, and your money is needed. Unlike the soldier, the investor runs no risk. If you invest in Exchequer Bonds your money, capital and interest alike, is secured on the Consolidated Fund of the United Kingdom, the premier security of the world."

Policy changed when Asquith's government fell in December 1916 and Bonar Law became Chancellor in the new coalition government. The third War Loan was launched in January 1917 at a 5% discount to face value and paying 5% interest (or 4% tax-free for 25 years), a rate Lloyd George described as "penal". Holders of existing War Loans, Treasury Bills and War Expenditure Certificates could convert to the 5% issue. Of the £2.08 billion raised by the 5% War Loan, only £845 million was new money; the rest was conversions of £820 million of 4.5% Loan, £281 million of Exchequer Bonds and £130 million of Treasury Bills. Labour politician Tom Johnston would later write of the 1917 War Loan "No foreign conqueror could have devised a more complete robbery and enslavement of the British Nation".

On 30 June 1932 Neville Chamberlain announced that the Government would exercise its right to call in the 5% War Loan, offering a choice of taking cash or continuing the loan at 3.5%. Although they were obliged to give 90 days' notice of such a change, a 1% tax-free cash bonus was offered to holders who acted by 31 July. This conversion saved the government about £23 million net per year. On 3 December 2014 the UK Government announced it would redeem the outstanding war loans on 9 March 2015.

=== United States ===
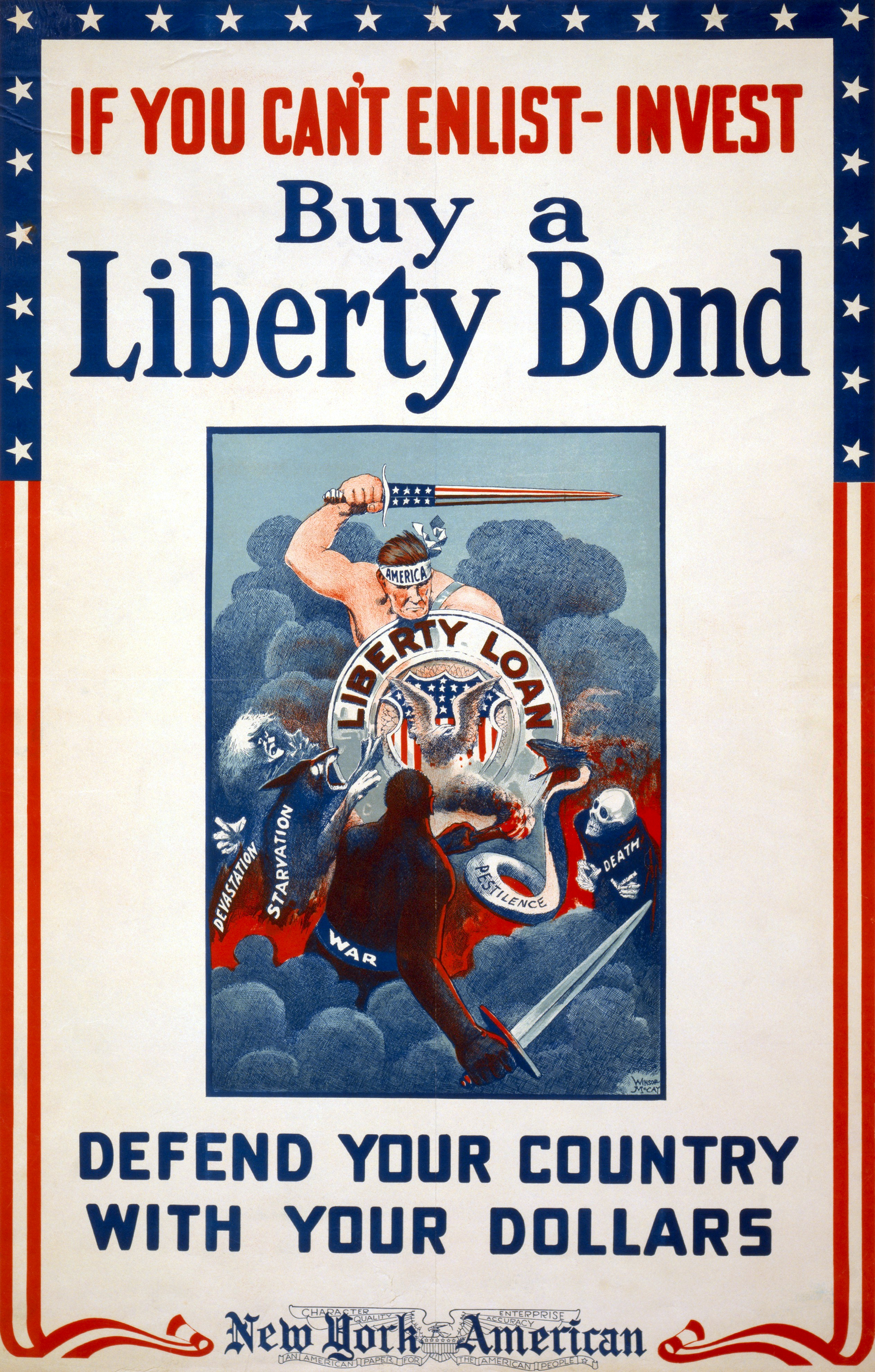
Advertising poster for World War I Liberty Bonds

In 1917 and 1918, the United States government issued Liberty Bonds to raise money for its involvement in World War I. An aggressive campaign was created by Secretary of the Treasury William Gibbs McAdoo to popularize the bonds, grounded largely as patriotic appeals. The Treasury Department worked closely with the Committee on Public Information in developing Liberty Bond campaigns. The resulting propaganda messages often borrowed heavily from military colloquial speech.

The government used famous artists to make posters and used movie and stage stars to host bond rallies. Al Jolson, Ethel Barrymore, Marie Dressler, Elsie Janis, Theda Bara, Fatty Arbuckle, Mabel Normand, Mary Pickford, Douglas Fairbanks and Charlie Chaplin were among the celebrities who made public appearances promoting the patriotic element of purchasing Liberty Bonds. Chaplin also made a short film, The Bond, at his own expense for the drive. Even the Boy Scouts and Girl Scouts sold bonds under the slogan "Every Scout to Save a Soldier". The campaign spurred community efforts across the country to sell the bonds and was a great success resulting in over-subscriptions to the second, third, and fourth bond issues. According to the Massachusetts Historical Society, "Because the first World War cost the federal government more than $30 billion (by way of comparison, total federal expenditures in 1913 were only $970 million), these programs became vital as a way to raise funds."

== World War II ==
=== Canada ===
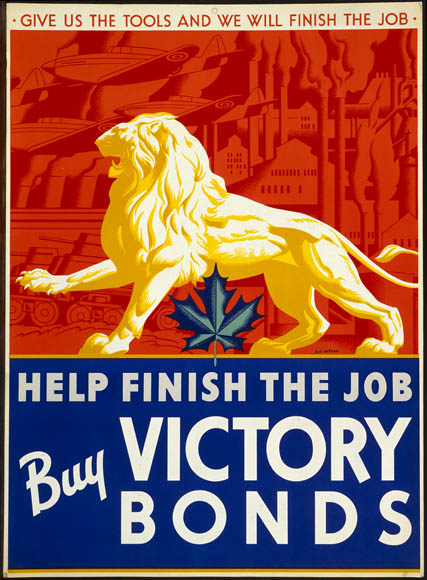
A. J. Casson's Canadian Victory Bonds poster Give Us The Tools 1941

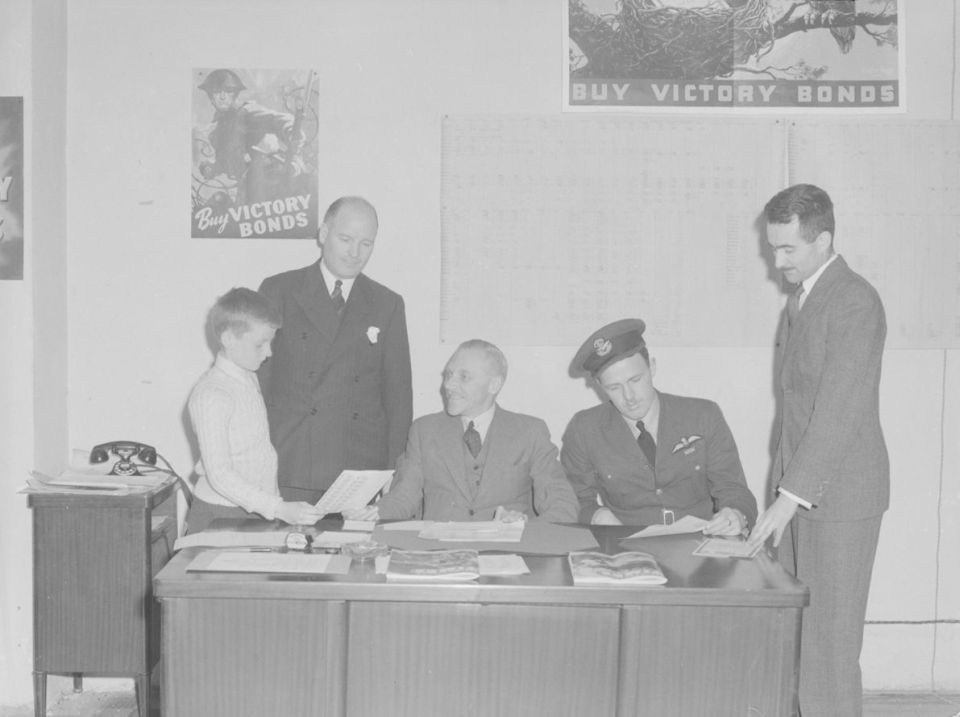
Victory Bond sales in Montreal in 1943

Canada's involvement in the Second World War began when Canada declared war on Nazi Germany on September 10, 1939, one week after the United Kingdom. Approximately half of the Canadian war cost was covered by War Savings Certificates and war bonds known as "Victory Bonds" as in World War I. War Savings Certificates began selling in May 1940 and were sold door-to-door by volunteers as well as at banks, post offices, trust companies and other authorised dealers. The certificates matured after seven years, providing a return of $5 for every $4 invested. Initially, individual ownership was limited to $500 in maturities per year, though this cap was later raised to $600. Although the effort raised $318 million in funds and was successful in financially involving millions of Canadians in the war effort, it only provided the Government of Canada with a fraction of what was needed.

The sale of Victory Bonds proved far more successful financially. There were ten wartime and one postwar Victory Bond drives. Unlike the War Savings Certificates, there was no purchase limit to Victory Bonds. The bonds were issued with maturities of between six and fourteen years with interest rates ranging from 1.5% for short-term bonds and 3% for long-term bonds and were issued in denominations of between $50 and $100,000. Canadians bought $12.5 billion worth of Victory Bonds or some $550 per capita with businesses accounting for half of all Victory Bond sales. The first Victory Bond issue in February 1940 met its goal of $20 million in less than 48 hours, the second issue in September 1940 reaching its goal of $30 million almost as quickly.

When it became apparent that the war would last a number of years the war bond and certificate programs were organised more formally under the National War Finance Committee in December 1941, directed initially by the president of the Bank of Montreal and subsequently by the Governor of the Bank of Canada. Under the more honed direction the committee developed strategies, propaganda and the wide recruitment of volunteers for bonds drives. Bond drives took place every six months during which no other organization was permitted to solicit the public for money. The government spent over $3 million on marketing which employed posters, direct mailing, movie trailers (including some by Walt Disney in cooperation with the newly established National Film Board of Canada's animation department that the former partner helped establish), radio commercials and full page advertisements in most major daily newspapers and weekly magazines. Realistic staged military invasions, such as the If Day scenario in Winnipeg, Manitoba, were even employed to raise awareness and shock citizens into purchasing bonds.

=== Germany ===
The Nazi regime never attempted to convince the general populace to buy long-term war bonds as had been done during the First World War. The Reich government did not want to present any perceived form of public referendum on the war, which would be the indirect result if a bond drive did poorly. Rather, the regime financed its war efforts by borrowing directly from financial institutions, using short-term war bonds as collateral. German bankers, with no demonstration of resistance, agreed to taking state bonds into their portfolios. Financial institutions transferred their money to the Finance Department in exchange for promissory notes. Through this strategy, 40 million bank and investment accounts were quietly converted into war bonds, providing the Reich government with a continuous supply of money. Likewise, German bank commissioners compelled occupied Czechoslovakia to buy up German war bonds. By the end of the war, German war bonds accounted for 70% of investments held by Czechoslovak banks.

=== United Kingdom ===
In the United Kingdom, the National Savings Movement was instrumental in raising funds for the war effort during both world wars. During World War II a War Savings Campaign was set up by the War Office to support the war effort. Local savings weeks were held which were promoted with posters with titles such as "Lend to Defend the Right to Be Free", "Save Your Way to Victory" and "War Savings Are Warships".

=== United States ===
President Franklin D. Roosevelt introduces the Series E Bond.

By the summer of 1940, the victories of Nazi Germany against Poland, Denmark, Norway, Belgium, the Netherlands, France, and Luxembourg brought urgency to the government, which was discreetly preparing for possible United States involvement in World War II. Of principal concern were issues surrounding war financing. Many of President Franklin D. Roosevelt's advisers favored a system of tax increases and enforced savings program as advocated by British economist John Maynard Keynes. In theory, this would permit increased spending while decreasing the risk of inflation. However, Secretary of the Treasury Henry Morgenthau Jr. preferred a voluntary loan system and began planning a national defense bond program in the fall of 1940. The intent was to unite the attractiveness of the baby bonds that had been implemented in the interwar period with the patriotic element of the Liberty Bonds from the First World War.

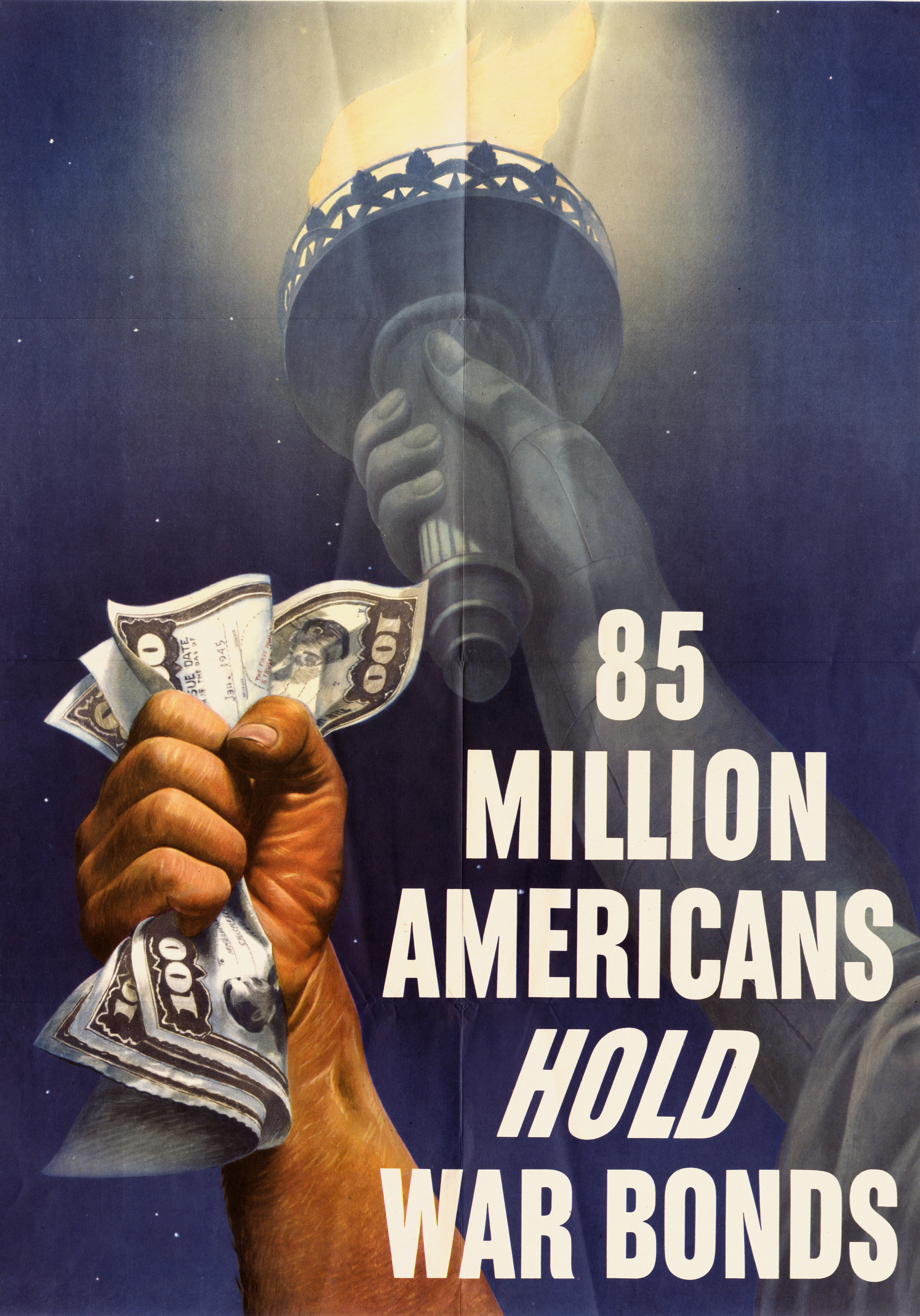
A poster designed to encourage war bond purchases.

Henry Morgenthau Jr. sought the aid of Peter Odegard, a political scientist specialised in propaganda, in drawing up the goals for the bond program. On the advice of Odegard the Treasury began marketing the previously successful baby bonds as "defense bonds". Three new series of bond notes, Series E, F and G, would be introduced, of which Series E would be targeted at individuals as "defense bonds". Like the baby bonds, they were sold for as little as $18.75 and matured in ten years, at which time the United States government paid the bondholder $25. Large denominations of between $50 and $1000 were also made available, all of which, unlike the Liberty Bonds of the First World War, were non-negotiable bonds. For those who found it difficult to purchase an entire bond at once, 10-cent savings stamps could be purchased and collected in Treasury-approved stamp albums until the recipient had accumulated enough stamps for a bond purchase. The name of the bonds was eventually changed to War Bonds after the Japanese attack on Pearl Harbor on 7 December 1941, which resulted in the United States entering the war.

The War Finance Committee was placed in charge of supervising the sale of all bonds, and the War Advertising Council promoted voluntary compliance with bond buying. Popular contemporary art was used to help promote the bonds such as Any Bonds Today?, a 1942 Warner Bros. theatrical cartoon. More than a quarter of a billion dollars' worth of advertising was donated during the first three years of the National Defense Savings Program. The government appealed to the public through popular culture. Norman Rockwell's painting series, the Four Freedoms, toured in a war bond effort that raised $132 million. Bond rallies were held throughout the country with famous celebrities, usually Hollywood film stars, to enhance the bond advertising effectiveness. Many motion pictures during the time, especially war dramas (a form of propaganda itself), included a graphic shown during the closing credits advising patrons to "Buy War Bonds and Stamps", which were sometimes sold in the lobby of the theater. The Music Publishers Protective Association encouraged its members to include patriotic messages on the front of their sheet music like "Buy U.S. Bonds and Stamps". Over the course of the war 85 million Americans purchased bonds totalling approximately $185 billion.

Named after the 1942 Hollywood Victory Caravan, a 1945 Paramount Pictures-produced film promoted bond sales after the end of World War II. The short subject included Bing Crosby, Bob Hope, Alan Ladd, William Demarest, Franklin Pangborn, Barbara Stanwyck, Humphrey Bogart, and others.

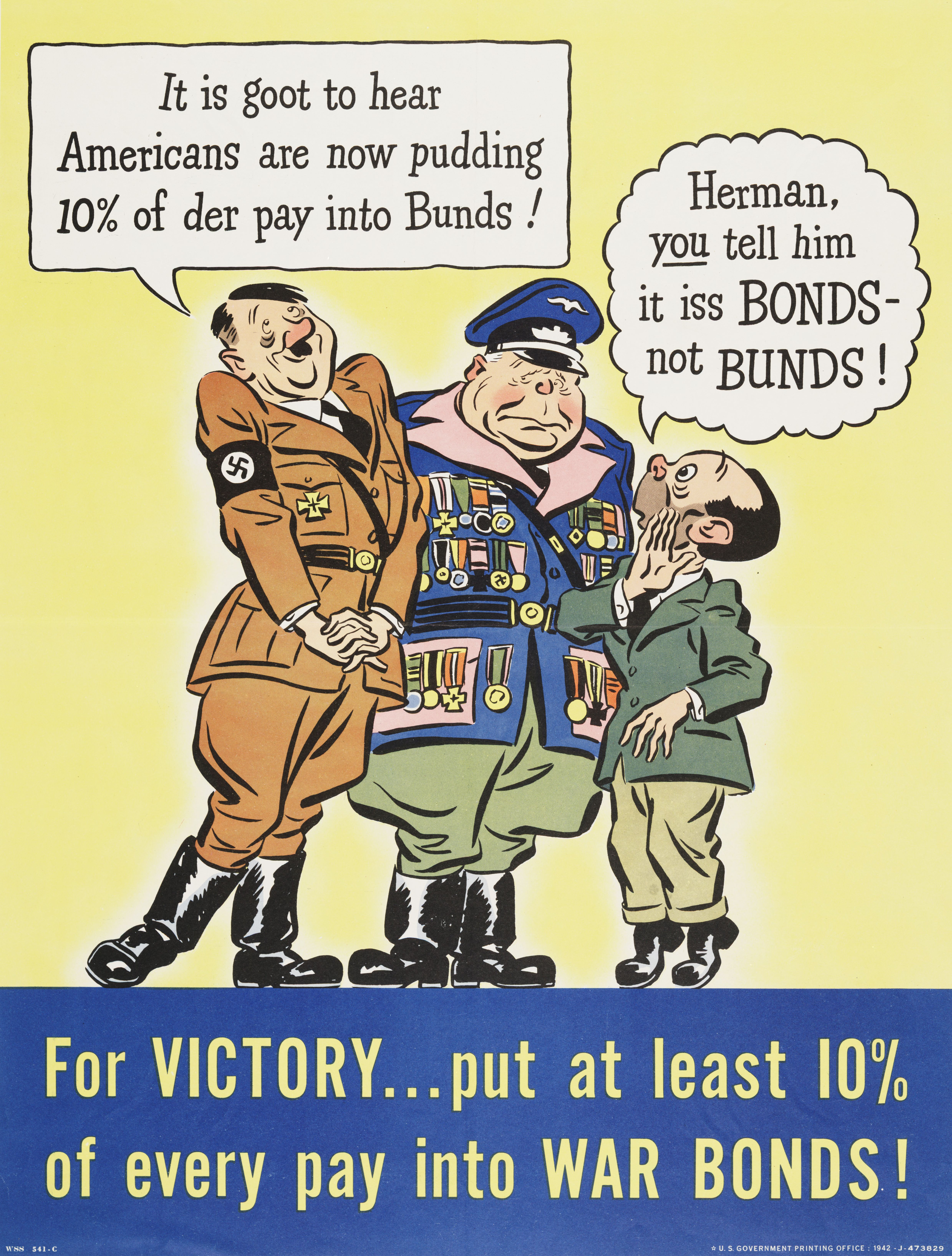
"Bonds, Not Bunds" poster, 1943

Aside from movies and music, there were countless other programs held throughout the states to encourage the purchasing of war bonds. One such promotion that was held, at the least, in Nebraska and Montana, allowed for citizens to "get Hitler's goat," a play on the phrase "to get someone's goat" meaning to make someone angry or annoyed. The goat would be held up for "auction" with the money going directly towards war bonds. According to one source, the auctioning of "Hitler's goat" in Nebraska in 1942 raised $90,000 in War Bond sales.

The National Service Board for Religious Objectors offered civilian bonds in the United States during World War II, primarily to members of the historic peace churches as an alternative for those who could not conscientiously buy something meant to support the war. These were U.S. Government Bonds not labelled as defense bonds. In all, 33,006 subscriptions were sold for a total value of $6.74 million, mostly to Mennonites, Brethren, and Quakers.

Research has shown that parties to a conflict at the beginning of warfare can obtain cheap financing. As the conflict develops, bond yields increase but only to a certain level. Once a certain threshold is exceeded, there is no increase in the yield. The phenomenon was explained by the clientele effect, i.e., the differentiation of groups that purchase financial instruments. The first issuances of war bonds are mainly covered by investors seeking profit and the so-called "patriotic demand". As the conflict develops, the risk increases, and only patriotic demand persists.

== After World War II ==
=== South Africa ===
In the late 1970s and 1980s, South Africa issued Defence Bonus Bonds in order to fund the border wars in Angola and Namibia and to fund its defence industry.

=== Iraq ===
During the Iran–Iraq War, the Iraqi government started a campaign to gather war bonds. Each war bond cost 100 dinars. The government also requested Iraqis donate any extra/spare gold to the war effort; this possibly raised over 700 kilos to a ton of gold.

=== Ukraine ===
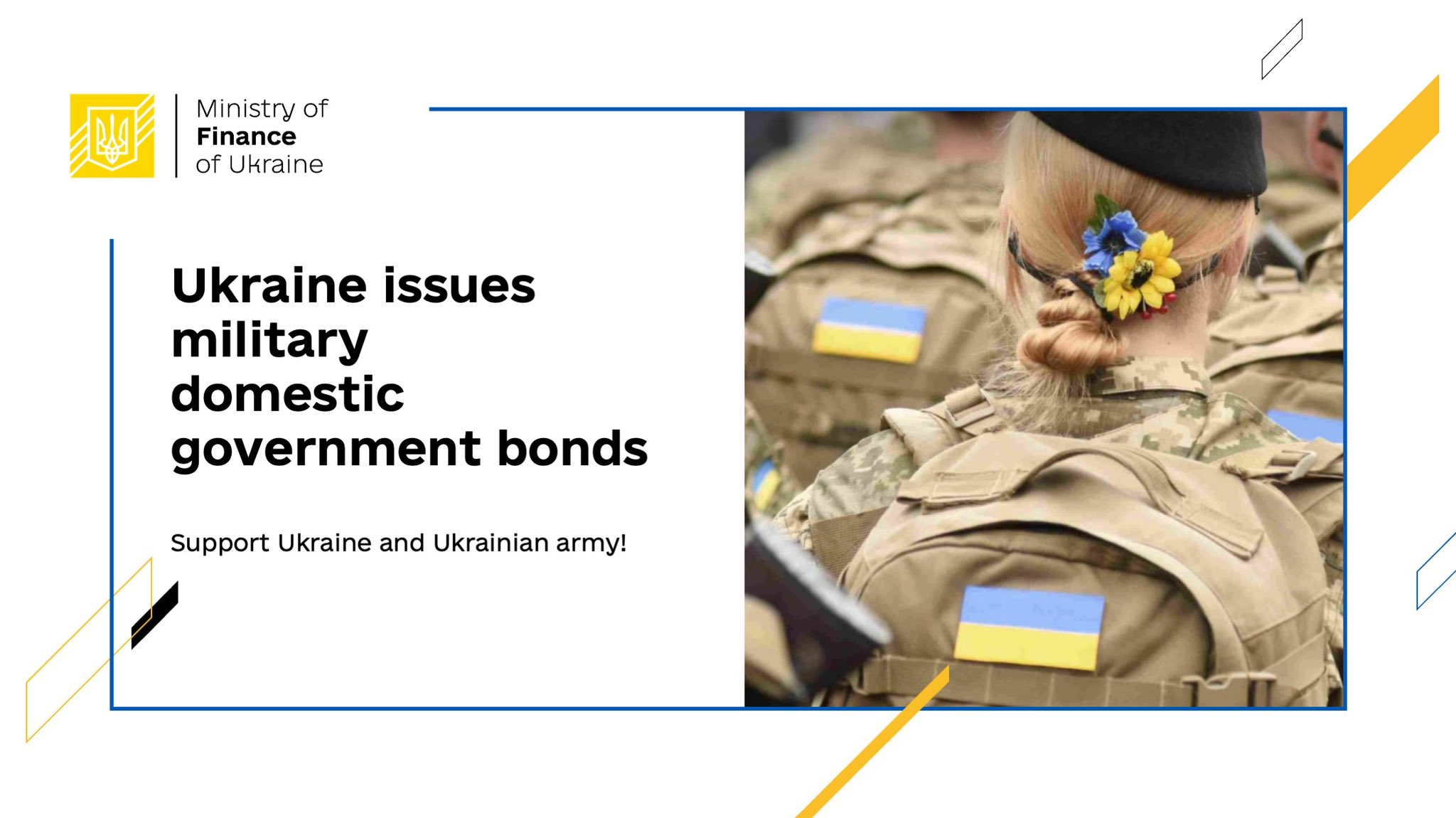
Promotion of Ukrainian war bond auction in English (2022)

On 1 March 2022, following the Russian invasion of Ukraine, the Ukrainian government announced it would issue war bonds to pay its armed forces. Between March and May 2022, around $270 million equivalent of bonds were sold, maturing in one year and yielding 11 percent. The bonds were sold in small units of 1,000 hryvnias, with over 70,000 buyers.

=== Canada ===
On 28 October 2022, during the Russian invasion of Ukraine, the Government of Canada announced the issuance of 5-year bonds to raise funds for Ukraine. In late November 2022, the C$500 million raised from the bond issuance was directed to the IMF's Administered Account for Ukraine.
