= Bykowice =

- Village
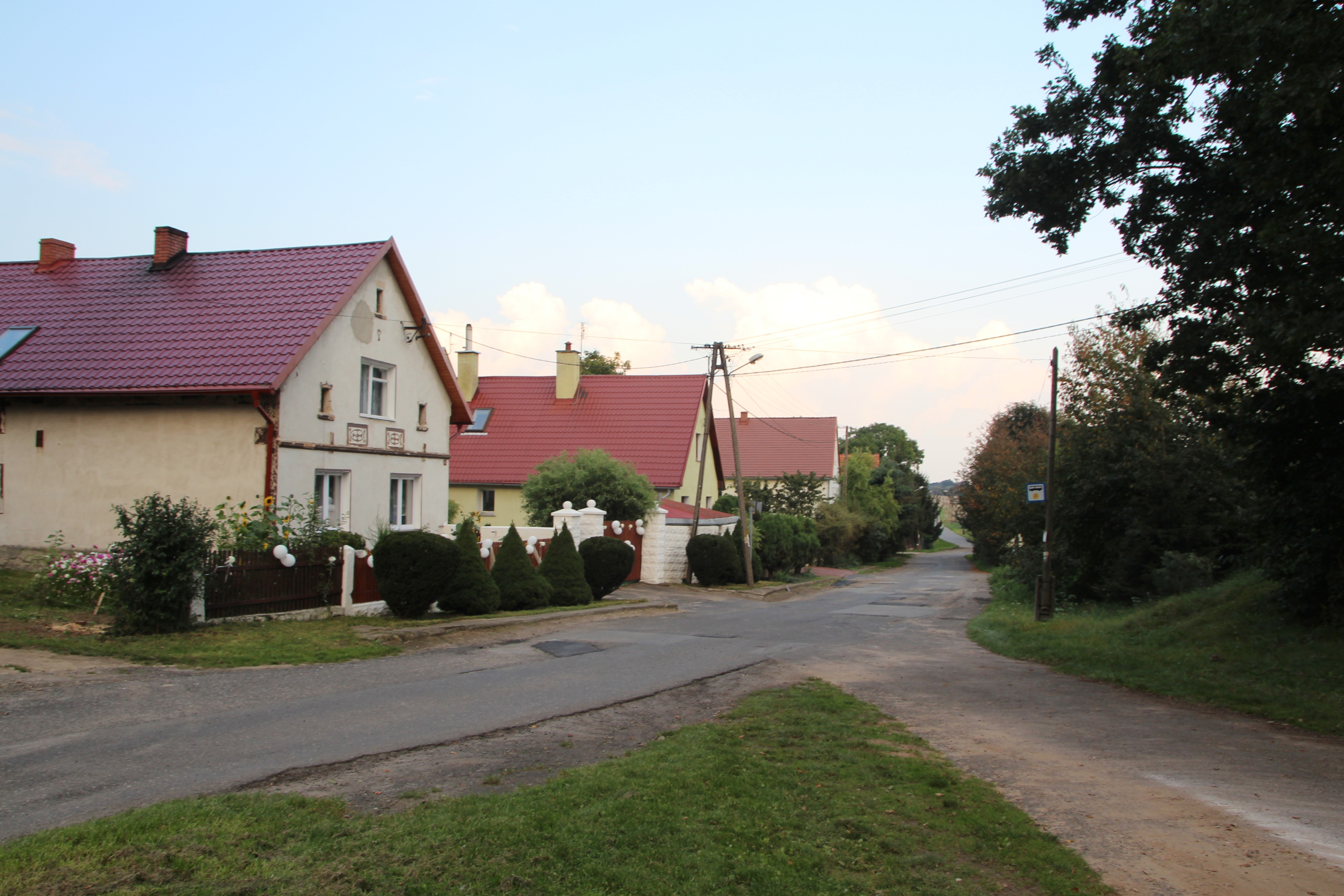

- Location within Poland
- Coordinates: 50°31′43″N 17°19′45″E
- Country: Poland
- Voivodeship: Opole
- County: Nysa
- Gmina: Pakosławice

Bykowice [bɨkɔˈvit͡sɛ] (German: Beigwitz) is a village in the administrative district of Gmina Pakosławice, within Nysa County, Opole Voivodeship, in south-western Poland.
