= Smilovice =

Smilovice may refer to places in the Czech Republic:

- Smilovice (Frýdek-Místek District), a municipality and village in the Moravian-Silesian Region
- Smilovice (Mladá Boleslav District), a municipality and village in the Central Bohemian Region
- Smilovice (Rakovník District), a municipality and village in the Central Bohemian Region
- Smilovice, a village and part of Chotilsko in the Central Bohemian Region
- Smilovice, a village and part of Staňkovice (Kutná Hora District) in the Central Bohemian Region
- Smilovice, a village and part of Žimutice in the South Bohemian Region

== See also ==
- Śmiłowice (disambiguation)
