= Andrew Coyne =

Canadian journalist and author (born 1960)

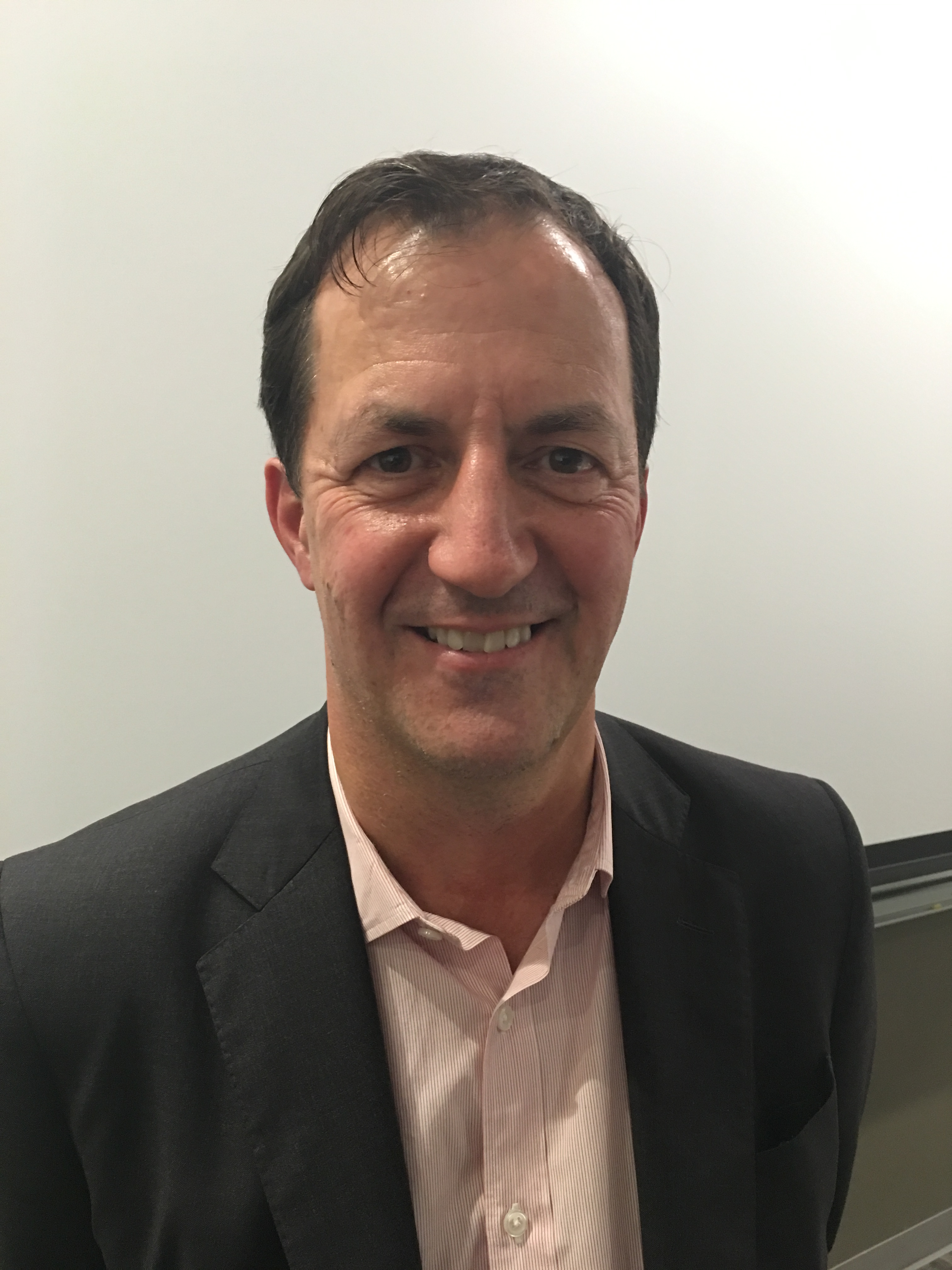
- Andrew Coyne, October 2016
- Born: James Andrew Coyne; 23 December 1960 (age 65); Ottawa, Ontario, Canada
- Education: University of Manitoba; Trinity College, Toronto; London School of Economics
- Occupations: Journalist, editor
- Father: James Elliott Coyne
- Relatives: Susan Coyne (sister); Deborah Coyne (cousin); James Henry Coyne (great-grandfather)

James Andrew Coyne (born 23 December 1960) is a Canadian columnist with The Globe and Mail and a member of the At Issue panel on CBC's The National. Previously, he has been national editor for Maclean's and a columnist with National Post.

== Early life and education ==
Coyne was born in Ottawa, Ontario, the son of Hope Meribeth Cameron (née Stobie) and James Elliott Coyne, who was governor of the Bank of Canada from 1955 to 1961. His paternal great-grandfather was historian and lawyer James Henry Coyne. His sister is actress Susan Coyne. He is also the cousin of constitutional lawyer Deborah Coyne, who is the mother of Pierre Trudeau's youngest child.

Coyne graduated from Kelvin High School in Winnipeg. Coyne studied at the University of Manitoba where he became the editor of The Manitoban student newspaper. He also spent two years reporting for the Winnipeg Sun. In 1981, Coyne transferred to the University of Toronto's Trinity College, where his classmates included Jim Balsillie, Malcolm Gladwell, Tony Clement, Nigel Wright, Patricia Pearson, Atom Egoyan, and author and political strategist John Duffy. He received a BA in economics and history from Trinity. Coyne then went to the London School of Economics, where he received his master's degree in economics.

== Career ==
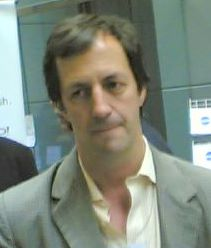
Andrew Coyne in 2006

After a six-year period as a Financial Post columnist from 1985 to 1991, Coyne joined The Globe and Mail's editorial board. There, Coyne won two consecutive National Newspaper Awards for his work. He had a regular column in the Globe between 1994 and 1996, when he joined Southam News (later CanWest News Service) as a nationally syndicated columnist.

Coyne became a columnist with the National Post – the successor to the Financial Post – when it launched in 1998. Coyne left the Post in 2007 to work at Maclean's.

Coyne left Maclean's in 2011 to return to the Post as a columnist. In December 2014, he was appointed to the position of Editorials and Comment Editor. After years of writing a weekly Saturday column, Coyne's contribution was absent from the edition published just prior to the 2015 Canadian federal election, because the column he wanted to submit called for a vote against the Conservative Party of Canada while the Post's editorial board had endorsed the Conservatives. While Coyne was the head of the editorial board, the decision to endorse the Conservatives was made by the newspaper's publisher Paul Godfrey. On election day, Coyne announced that as a result of the paper refusing to run his election column, he was resigning as the Post's editorial page and comment editor but would remain as a columnist.

Coyne has also been published in The Wall Street Journal, National Review, Saturday Night, the now-defunct Canadian edition of Time, and other publications. Coyne has also written for the conservative magazine The Next City.

Coyne has been a longtime member of the At Issue panel on CBC's The National, where he appeared as early as 2007 in the day of Peter Mansbridge. His role on the panel, hosted by CBC Chief Political Correspondent Rosemary Barton, has made him a household name, appearing every Thursday evening alongside panelists Chantal Hébert and Althia Raj.

In November 2019, Coyne announced that he would henceforth be employed by The Globe and Mail.

Coyne is a proponent of the Century Initiative, a proposal spearheaded by Dominic Barton to increase Canada's population to 100 million by 2100. He admits that this lofty goal might not increase Canada's standard of living. Nevertheless he supports it because it is ambitious and might result in more global clout for his home country.

During the Gaza war, Andrew Coyne wrote in his Opinion piece titled "Continuing the Israeli military campaign in Gaza can no longer be justified, morally or strategically": "Israeli military has broadly observed the laws of war" and that there was no genocide in Gaza.

== Honours ==
=== Scholastic ===
Honorary degrees

Location	Date	School	Degree	Gave Commencement Address
Manitoba	31 May 2016	University of Manitoba	Doctor of Laws (LL.D)	Yes

=== Awards ===
Location	Date	Institution	Award
Ontario	1994	Public Policy Forum	Hyman Solomon Award for Excellence in Public Policy Journalism

== See also ==
- List of newspaper columnists
