= Korzękwice =

- Village
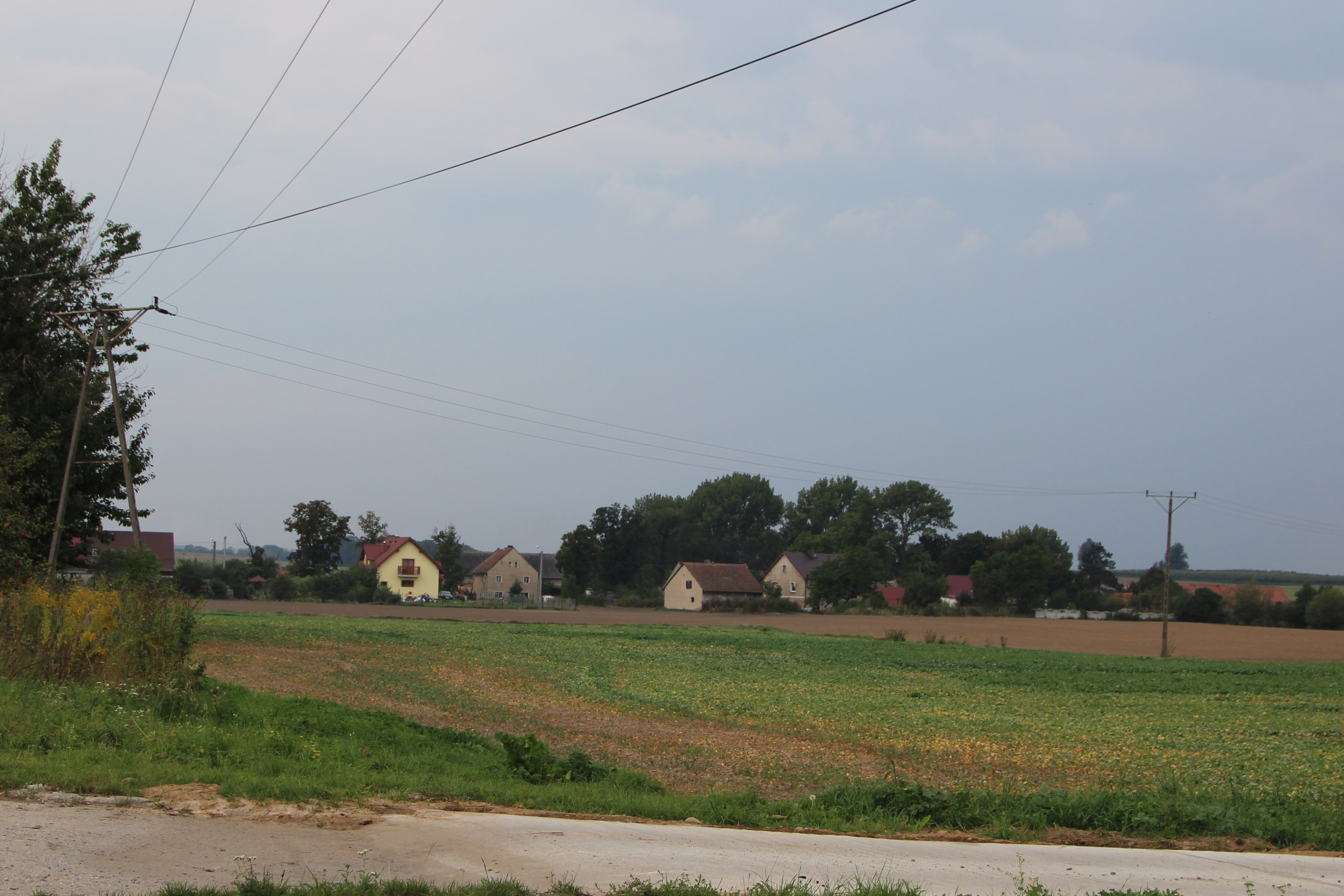

- Location within Poland
- Coordinates: 50°31′54″N 17°18′0″E
- Country: Poland
- Voivodeship: Opole
- County: Nysa
- Gmina: Pakosławice
- Population: 180

Korzękwice [kɔʐɛnkˈfit͡sɛ] (German: Korkwitz) is a village in the administrative district of Gmina Pakosławice, within Nysa County, Opole Voivodeship, in south-western Poland.
