= Pakosławice =

- Village
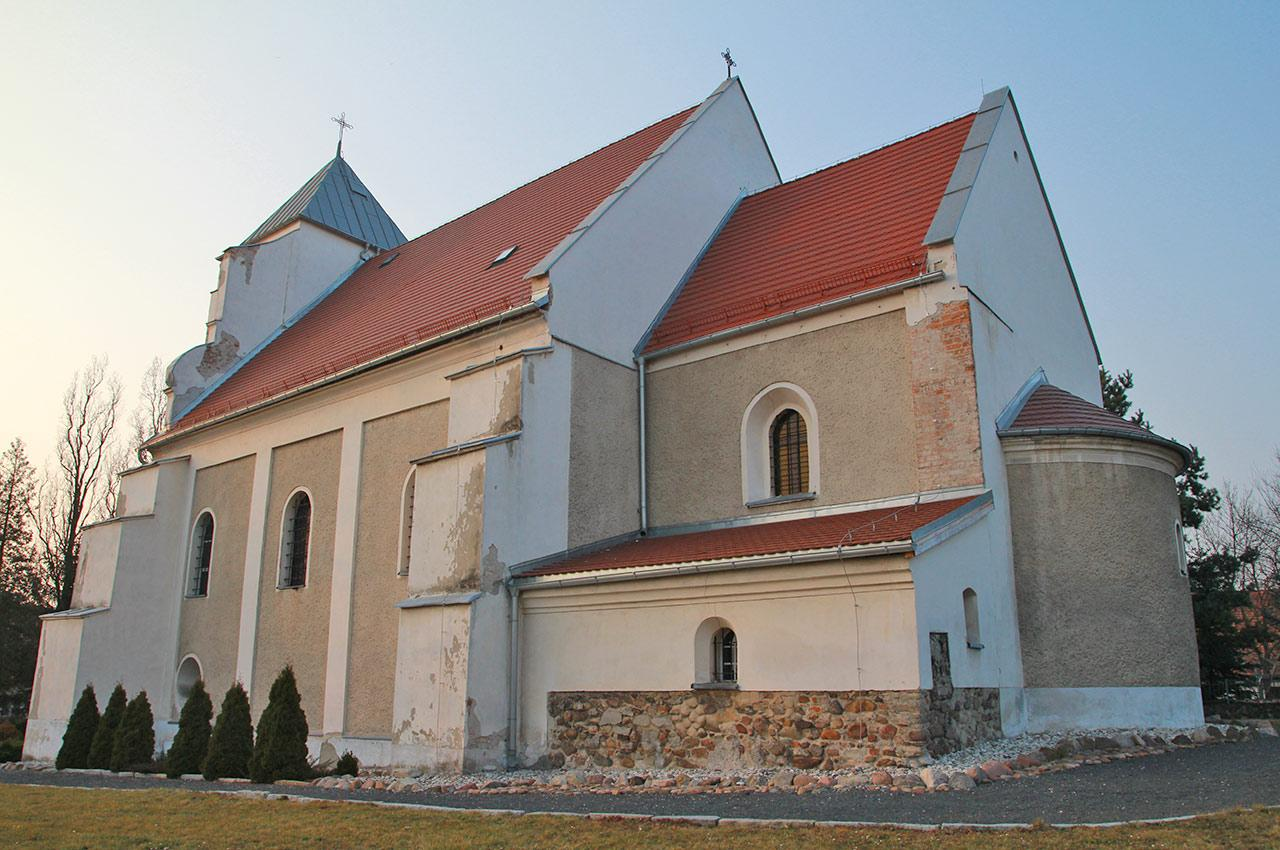
- Church of Saints Peter and Paul

- Location within Poland
- Coordinates: 50°32′N 17°21′E
- Country: Poland
- Voivodeship: Opole
- County: Nysa
- Gmina: Pakosławice

Population
  - Total: 500

Pakosławice [pakɔswaˈvit͡sɛ] (German: Bösdorf) is a village in Nysa County, Opole Voivodeship, in south-western Poland. It is the seat of the gmina (administrative district) called Gmina Pakosławice.
