= Reńska Wieś, Nysa County =

Reńska Wieś
- Village
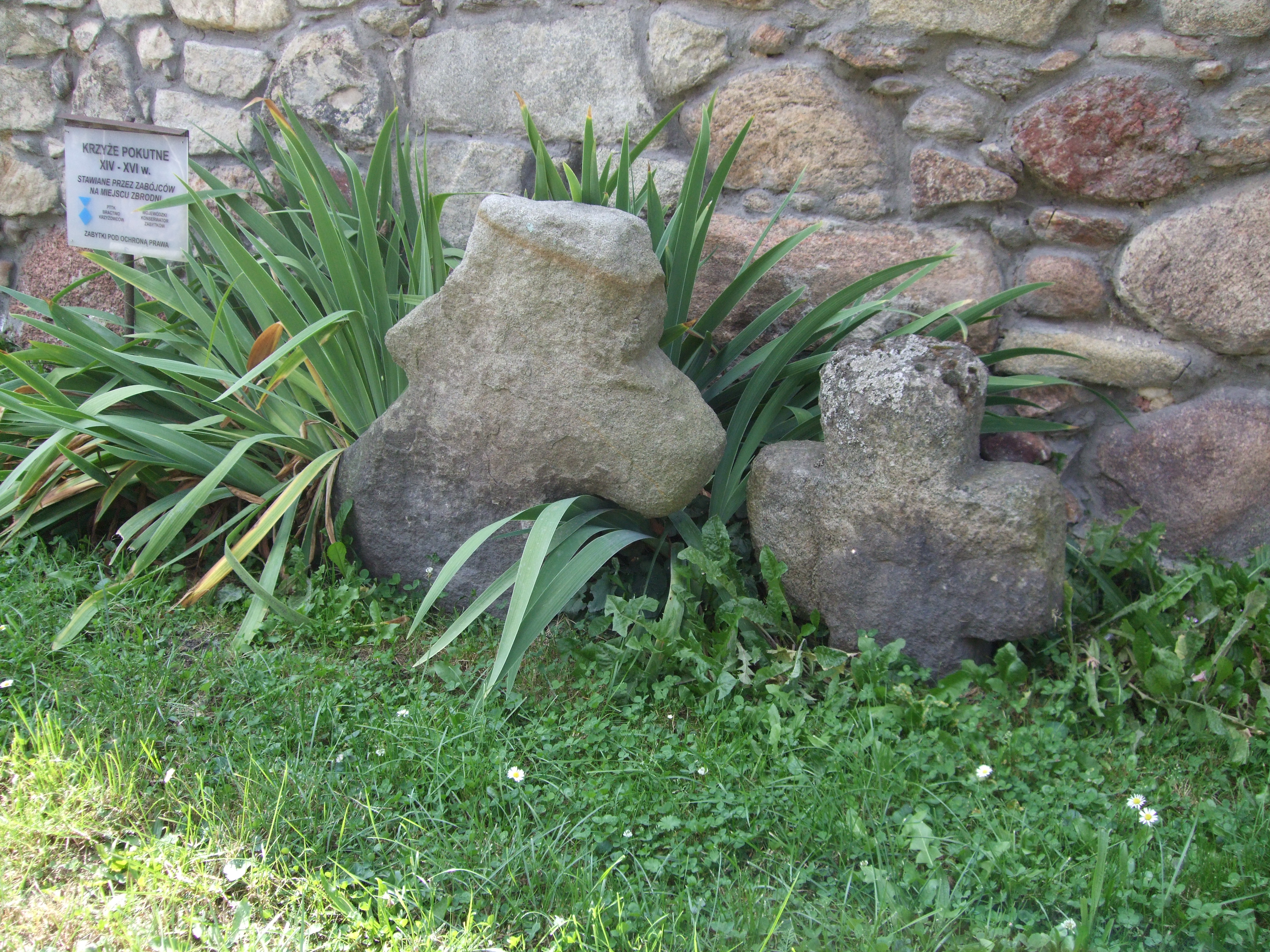
- Stone cross

- Location within Poland
- Coordinates: 50°33′N 17°21′E
- Country: Poland
- Voivodeship: Opole
- County: Nysa
- Gmina: Pakosławice

Reńska Wieś [ˈrɛɲska ˈvjɛɕ] (German: Reinschdorf) is a village in the administrative district of Gmina Pakosławice, within Nysa County, Opole Voivodeship, in south-western Poland.
