= George Wilbur Spinney =

Canadian banker (1889-1948)

- Born: 3 April 1889; Yarmouth, Nova Scotia
- Died: 1 February 1948 (aged 58); Montreal, Quebec
- Spouse: Martha Maud Ramsay (m. 1916)

George Wilbur Spinney CMG (3 April 1889 – 1 February 1948) was a Canadian banker. He served as president of the Bank of Montreal from December 1942 until his death in February 1948. He was also chairman of the National War Finance Committee from its inception in 1941 until 1943, when he became the honorary chairman.

== Life and career ==
Spinney was born in Yarmouth, Nova Scotia on April 3, 1889. He joined Bank of Montreal after high school, and served in a number of capacities before being appointed as secretary to the General Manager, Sir Frederick Williams-Taylor, in 1915. In 1922, Spinney was appointed assistant to the General Manager, responsible for organizing Bank of Montreal's securities department, and in 1928 he assumed responsibility for the Quebec, Maritimes and Newfoundland branches of the bank. In 1936, Spinney was appointed joint general manager of the bank with Jackson Dodds.

In 1940, following the accidental death of Minister of Defense Norman Rogers, Prime Minister Mackenzie King asked Spinney to be his new Minister of Finance (Finance Minister D.L Ralston assumed Rogers' Defense portfolio). Spinney respectfully declined - he was a businessman, not a politician - but offered his services in "...any other direction in which [they] could be utilized." Mackenzie King did not wait long to call on Spinney - in April 1941 the newly appointed Minister of Finance, J.L. Ilsley, asked Spinney to chair the first "Victory Loan" campaign, a new co-operative effort to raise $600 million, slated for launch in May and June 1941. The campaign was oversubscribed, but the effort was so costly and time-consuming, and ongoing war funding needs so great, that a permanent fund raising entity was clearly required. Hence the establishment (formally in January 1942) of the National War Finance Committee, chaired by Spinney. After four Victory Loan campaigns that raised more than $4 billion, Spinney resigned in April 1943 and his position was assumed by Graham Towers.

Spinney also served as president and as a governor of the Royal Victoria Hospital, and as a governor of McGill University. He served on the boards of a number of major Canadian corporations including Consolidated Mining and Smelting Company of Canada (subsequently Cominco), International Nickel Company of Canada, Steel Company of Canada, and Sun Life Assurance Company of Canada. In 1942 he received an honorary Doctor of Civil Law from Acadia University, and in June 1943 he was created a Companion of the Order of St Michael and St George.

Spinney was married to Martha Maud Ramsay of Saint Lambert, Quebec in 1916, and had three children, Wilbur (b. 1918), Ruth (b. 1920) and Martha (b. 1928). Spinney and his family resided at 1 Braeside Place (now part of The Study) from 1937 until Spinney's death in 1948. During World War II Wilbur "Bill" Spinney served as a gunnery officer in the Royal Canadian Navy, but he died of injuries while on active service in England days after V-E Day.
