= Spiny =

Spiny may refer to:

- Spiny, Poland, a village in the district of Gmina Pakosławice, within Nysa County, Opole Voivodeship, in south-western Poland
- Spiny, a fictional four-legged creature in the Mario franchise, often thrown by Lakitus

== See also ==
- Spinosa (disambiguation), a Latin word meaning spiny
