= Gmina Pakosławice =

Gmina Pakosławice Pakosławice Commune
- Gmina
- Flag Coat of arms
- Interactive map of Gmina Pakosławice
- Coordinates (Pakosławice): 50°32′45″N 17°21′49″E
- Country: Poland
- Voivodeship: Opole
- County: Nysa
- Seat: Pakosławice

Area
  - Total: 74.03 km^{2} (28.58 sq mi)

Population (2019-06-30)
  - Total: 3,508
  - Density: 47.39/km^{2} (122.7/sq mi)
- Website: http://www.pakoslawice.pl

Gmina Pakosławice is a rural gmina (administrative district) in Nysa County, Opole Voivodeship, in south-western Poland. Its seat is the village of Pakosławice, which lies approximately 9 kilometres (6 mi) north of Nysa and 43 km (27 mi) west of the regional capital Opole.

The gmina covers an area of 74.03 square kilometres (28.6 sq mi), and as of 2019 its total population is 3,508.

== Villages ==
Gmina Pakosławice contains the villages and settlements of Biechów, Bykowice, Frączków, Godkowice, Goszowice, Korzękwice, Naczków, Nowaki, Pakosławice, Prusinowice, Radowice, Reńska Wieś, Rzymiany, Słupice, Śmiłowice, Smolice, Spiny and Strobice.

== Neighbouring gminas ==
Gmina Pakosławice is bordered by the gminas of Grodków, Kamiennik, Łambinowice, Nysa, Otmuchów and Skoroszyce.

== Twin towns – sister cities ==
Gmina Pakosławice is twinned with:

- Mikulovice, Czech Republic
