= Biechów, Opole Voivodeship =

Biechów
- Village
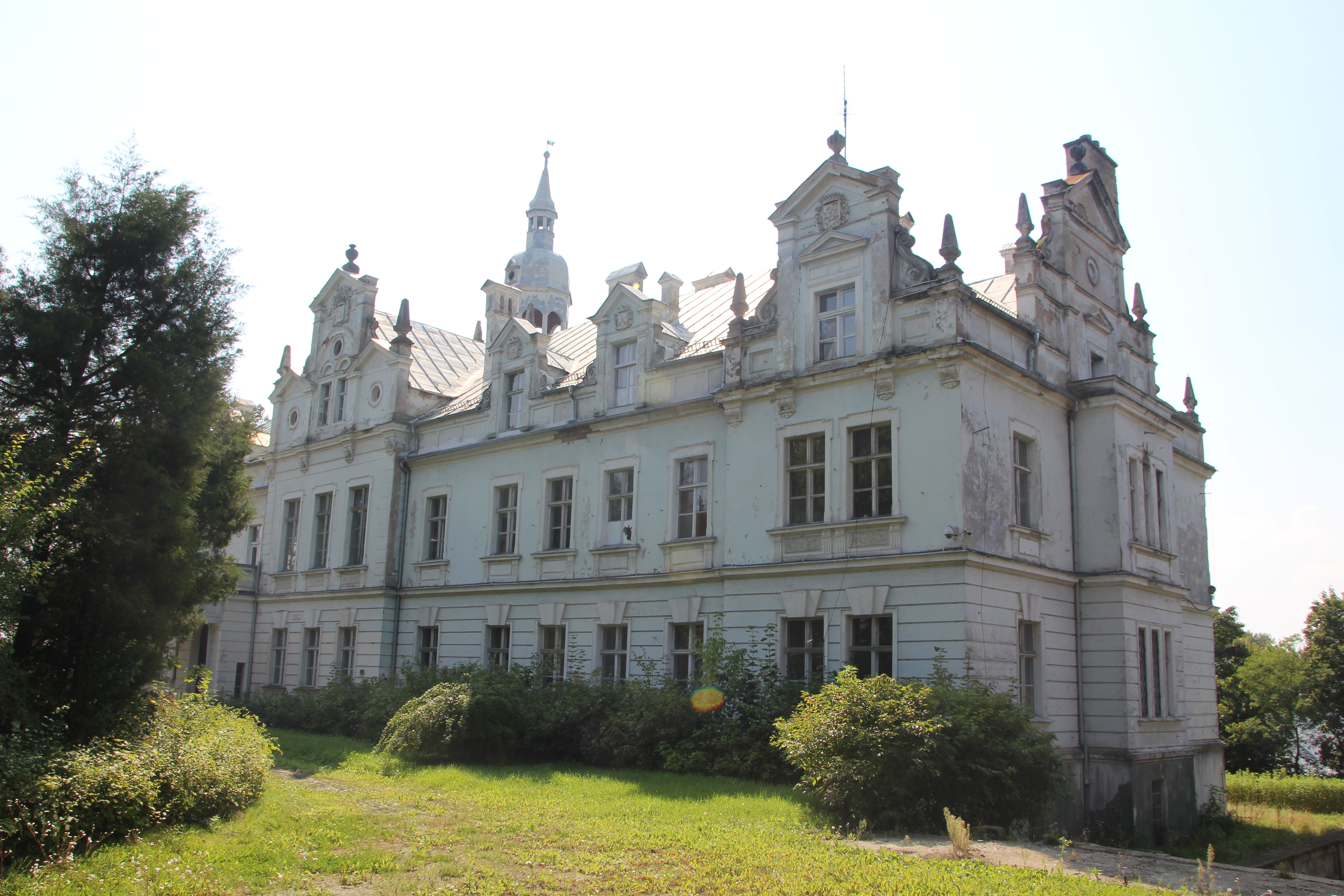

- Location within Poland
- Coordinates: 50°33′18″N 17°15′13″E
- Country: Poland
- Voivodeship: Opole
- County: Nysa
- Gmina: Pakosławice
- Population: 400

Biechów [ˈbjɛxuf] (German: Bechau) is a village in the administrative district of Gmina Pakosławice, within Nysa County, Opole Voivodeship, in south-western Poland.
