= Susan Coyne =

Canadian writer and actress

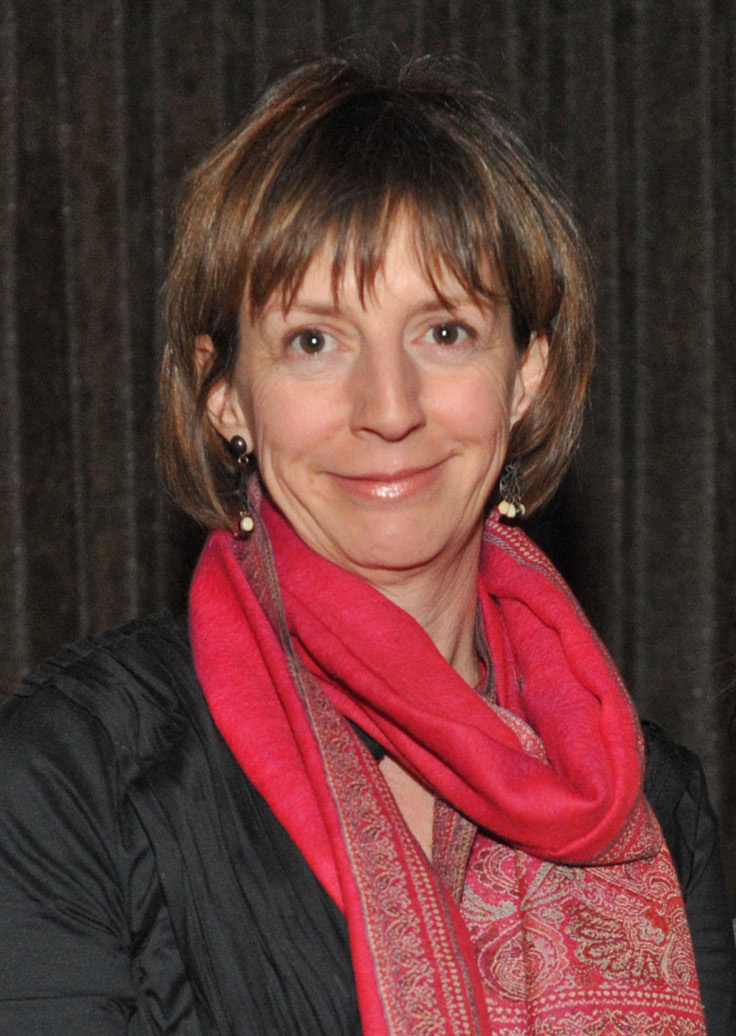
- Born: 16 June 1958 (age 68); Ottawa, Canada
- Occupations: Screenwriter, actor
- Known for: Slings & Arrows
- Father: James Elliott Coyne
- Relatives: Andrew Coyne (brother); Deborah Coyne (cousin); James Henry Coyne (great-grandfather)

Susan Coyne (born 16 June 1958) is a Canadian writer and actress, best known as one of the co-creators and co-stars of the award-winning Slings & Arrows, a TV series which ran 2003–06 about a Canadian Shakespearean theatre company. She has been nominated for four Writers Guild of Canada awards, in 2006 and 2007 and 2015, and won three. She was married to Canadian actor/director Albert Schultz. They have two children.

== Early life and education ==
Coyne was born in Ottawa on 16 June 1958, and comes from a prominent Canadian family. She is the daughter of Meribeth Cameron (née Stobie) and James Elliott Coyne, a former governor of the Bank of Canada, the sister of journalist Andrew Coyne, and the cousin of constitutional lawyer Deborah Coyne. She attended the St. John's-Ravenscourt School in Winnipeg, as did her acting colleague Martha Burns.

In 2017, Coyne was appointed a Member of the Order of Canada by the Governor General for her contributions to Canadian theatre, film and television as an actor and writer. She is a graduate of the National Theatre School of Canada.

== Career ==
A veteran of the Toronto theatre scene, she acted for several seasons at the Stratford Festival, was one of the founding members of the Soulpepper Theatre Company and is currently a playwright-in-residence at the Tarragon Theatre. Her two best-known plays are Kingfisher Days, an adaptation of her critically acclaimed memoir of the same name, and Alice's Affair. The edition of this memoir that was published in America was titled In the Kingdom of Fairies. It recounts her experiences in the summer of 1963 at her family's summer cottage on Lake of the Woods. She is also known for her translations of Anton Chekhov. Coyne also appeared in the Fernando Meirelles adaptation of the Jose Saramago novel, Blindness.

In 2006, she won two Gemini Awards for her work on Slings & Arrows: one for Best Performance by an Actress in a Featured Supporting Role in a Dramatic Series and one for Best Writing in a Dramatic Series (shared with her fellow co-creators, Bob Martin and Mark McKinney). In 2007, she again won for Best Writing in a Dramatic Series, but lost to co-star Martha Burns for Best Performance by an Actress in a Continuing Leading Dramatic Role.

She wrote the screenplay for the 2017 film The Man Who Invented Christmas, starring Dan Stevens and Christopher Plummer. Other television writing credits include Mozart in the Jungle, The Best Laid Plans, and L.M. Montgomery's Anne of Green Gables.
