= Strobice =

- Village
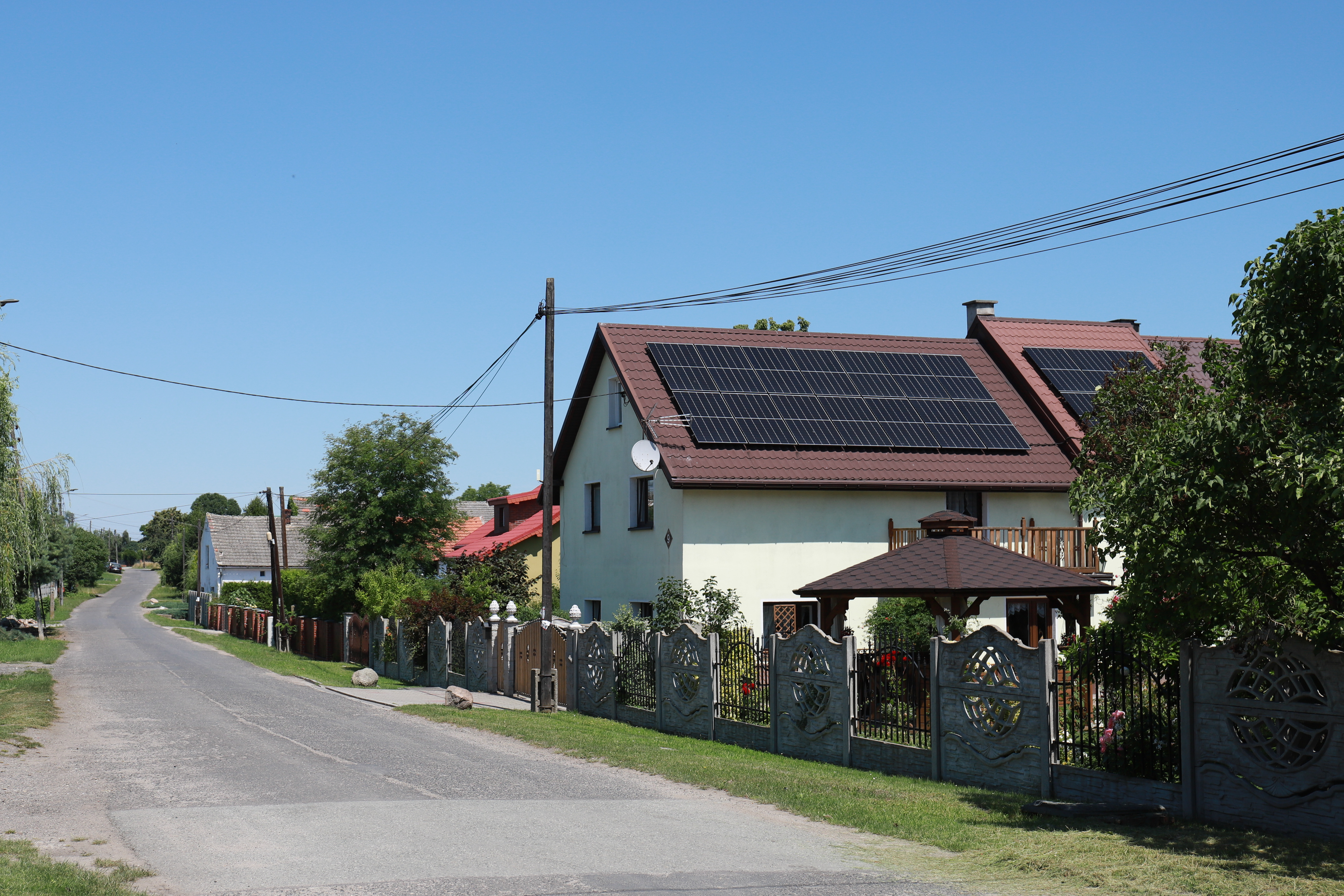

- Location within Poland
- Coordinates: 50°32′N 17°23′E
- Country: Poland
- Voivodeship: Opole
- County: Nysa
- Gmina: Pakosławice

Strobice [strɔˈbit͡sɛ] (German: Struwitz) is a village in the administrative district of Gmina Pakosławice, within Nysa County, Opole Voivodeship, in south-western Poland.
