= Deborah Coyne =

Canadian politician

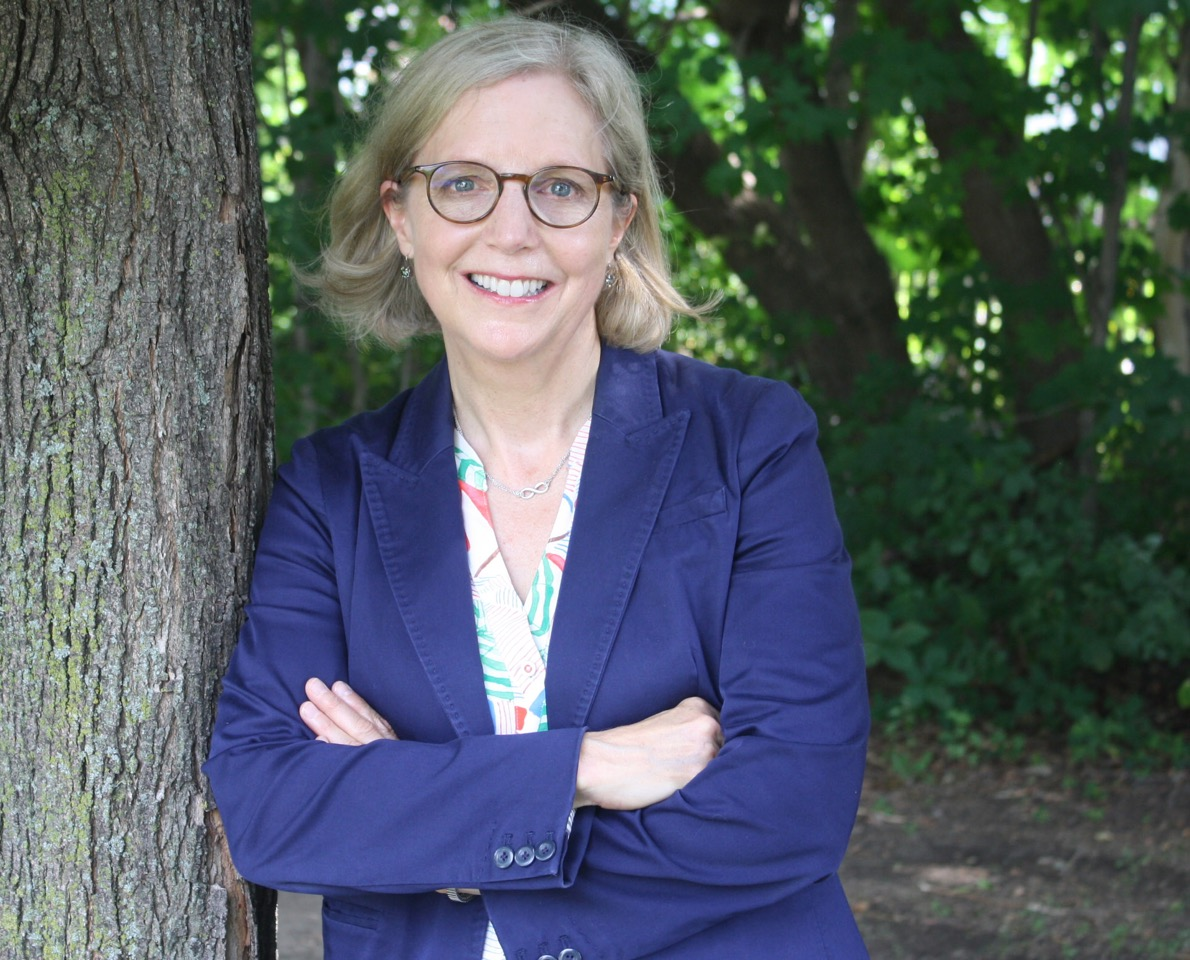
- Born: February 24, 1955 (age 71)
- Education: Queen's University; Osgoode Hall Law School; University of Oxford
- Occupations: Lawyer, professor, author
- Political party: Green (2015); Liberal (before 2015)
- Spouse: Michael Valpy (divorced)
- Partner: Pierre Trudeau
- Children: 2
- Website: deborahcoyne.ca

Deborah Margaret Ryland Coyne (born February 24, 1955) is a Canadian constitutional lawyer, professor, and author. She is the cousin of journalist Andrew Coyne and actress Susan Coyne, and the niece of former Bank of Canada governor James Elliott Coyne.

== Biography ==
Coyne grew up in Ottawa. She graduated from Queen's University with a degree in economics and history in 1976. She received a Bachelor of Laws degree from Osgoode Hall Law School of York University in 1979 and a Master of Philosophy from University of Oxford in international relations in 1982.

She was an employee in the Prime Minister's Office of John Turner, before spending two years teaching constitutional law at the University of Toronto Law School; she has also worked for the Business Council on National Issues, the Ontario Health Service Appeal and Review Board, and the Immigration and Refugee Board of Canada.

For years, Coyne dated former Prime Minister Pierre Trudeau. Their child, Sarah Elisabeth Coyne, is Trudeau's only daughter, and attended the Wharton School of the University of Pennsylvania. Her second child, Matthew Coyne, is the son of Canadian journalist Michael Valpy. Valpy and Coyne have since divorced.

Deborah Coyne now lives in Toronto.

== Political involvement ==
=== Opposition to the Meech Lake and Charlottetown Accords ===
Deborah Coyne took a role in opposing the Meech Lake Accord, a comprehensive package of constitutional amendments designed to gain the province of Quebec's formal acceptance of the Constitution Act, 1982. Coyne was among many prominent Liberals who disagreed with the Accord, including Pierre Elliott Trudeau, Donald Johnston and Jean Chrétien, although the issue split the federal Liberal caucus. She was a founding member of the Canadian Coalition on the Constitution, a grass-roots group that opposed the agreement. From 1989 to 1991, Coyne served as constitutional advisor to Newfoundland Premier Clyde Wells. Among the premiers, Wells was the staunchest opponent of the Meech Lake Constitutional Accord. Following the death of the Accord, partly at the hands of the Newfoundland House of Assembly, she opposed the Charlottetown Accord, a subsequent attempt to amend the Canadian constitution. The Charlottetown agreement was submitted to a national referendum in 1992 and was ultimately rejected by a majority of Canadian voters. Coyne led one of the "No" committees in the campaign and spoke widely against the deal.

=== Liberal candidate ===
Until the 2006 federal election was called, she was a member of the Immigration and Refugee Board of Canada. In that election, she ran in the electoral district of Toronto—Danforth as a Liberal Party candidate against New Democratic Party leader Jack Layton. Coyne finished second to Layton with 17,256 votes, or 34.2%.

Coyne was nominated in March 2007 as the Liberal Party of Canada candidate in Toronto Danforth but withdrew later in the year. In 2008, she sought the federal Liberal nomination in the riding of Don Valley West but withdrew in favour of Rob Oliphant.

=== Liberal leadership campaign ===
On June 27, 2012, Coyne announced that she would be a candidate for leader of the Liberal Party of Canada, during the Party's 2013 leadership contest, which was won ultimately by Justin Trudeau, the eldest son of her former partner Pierre Trudeau. Coyne placed fifth out of six candidates. Her campaign was managed by blogger Jeff Jedras.

Following the leadership campaign, Coyne made an unsuccessful bid for the Liberal Party of Canada's nomination in Ottawa West—Nepean in 2014.

=== Move to the Green Party ===
On February 26, 2015, Green Party of Canada Leader Elizabeth May announced that Coyne had been appointed as a senior policy advisor, noting "Deborah's thoughtful approach to One Canada for all Canadians complements the vision of the Green Party of Canada." Coyne was the Green Party of Canada candidate in the Ottawa riding of Carleton for the 2015 federal election, where she finished fourth with just over 3% of the vote.

Since the 2015 federal election, Coyne has stepped away from partisan politics and no longer holds a membership in any political party.

== Electoral record ==
2015 Canadian federal election: Carleton
| Party | Candidate | Votes | % | ±% | Expenditures |
|---|---|---|---|---|---|
| Conservative | Pierre Poilievre | 27,762 | 46.86 | −14.81 | $166,805.35 |
| Liberal | Chris Rodgers | 25,913 | 43.74 | +22.88 | $101,336.54 |
| New Democratic | KC Larocque | 3,632 | 6.13 | −7.22 | $17,692.44 |
| Green | Deborah Coyne | 1,932 | 3.26 | −0.86 | $15,632.31 |
| Total valid votes/expense limit | | 59,239 | 100.00 | | $206,141.87 |
| Total rejected ballots | | 196 | 0.33 | – | |
| Turnout | | 59,435 | 80.95 | – | |
| Eligible voters | | 73,418 | | | |
| Conservative notional hold | | Swing | | −18.84 | |
Source(s) Elections Canada – Confirmed candidates for Carleton, 30 September 2015; Elections Canada – Preliminary Election Expenses Limits for Candidates

2006 Canadian federal election: Toronto—Danforth
| Party | Candidate | Votes | % | ±% | Expenditures |
|---|---|---|---|---|---|
| New Democratic | Jack Layton | 24,412 | 48.42 | +2.08 | $ 74,966.33 |
| Liberal | Deborah Coyne | 17,256 | 34.23 | -7.11 | 74,304.11 |
| Conservative | Kren Clausen | 4,992 | 9.90 | +3.69 | 32,138.91 |
| Green | Al Hart | 3,583 | 7.11 | +1.73 | 6,770.73 |
| Marxist–Leninist | Marcell Rodden | 172 | 0.34 | +0.16 | – |
| Total valid votes/Expense limit | | 50,415 | 100.00 | – | $ 76,419.79 |
| Total rejected ballots | | 242 | 0.48 | -0.08 | |
| Turnout | | 50,657 | 67.67 | +3.57 | |
| New Democratic hold | | Swing | | +4.6 | |
Source(s) "Official Voting Results – Thirty-ninth General Election". (Table 12). "Financial Reports: Candidate's Electoral Campaign Return". Elections Canada.

== Published works ==
- — (1984). Monetary and financial reform: the North-South controversy. Ottawa: North-South Institute. ISBN 0-92049440-4.
- —; Howse, Robert (1992). No deal!: why Canadians should reject the Mulroney constitution. Hull: Voyageur Publishing. ISBN 0-92184220-1.
- — (1992). Roll of the Dice: Working with Clyde Wells during the Meech Lake Accord. Toronto: James Lorimer & Co. ISBN 1-55028369-3.
- — (1993). Seven Fateful Challenges for Canada: A Viable and Dynamic Canada in an Interdependent World. Montreal/Toronto: Robert Davies Publishing. ISBN 1-89585406-7.
- Valpy, Michael; — (1998). To Match a Dream: A Practical Guide to Canada's Constitution. Toronto: McClelland & Stewart. ISBN 0-77102277-8.
- — (2013). Unscripted: A Life Devoted to Building a Better Canada. Toronto: Canadian Writers Group.
- — (2019). Reform or Revolt: How Canadians can take back our democracy. Toronto: Kindle Direct Publishing.
- — (2021). Canada's Faux Democracy: What are we going to do about it?. Toronto: self-published. ISBN 978-1-927710-51-7.
- — (2025). Canada on the Edge: Canada must end our faux-democracy now, and urgently rebuild a stronger, united federation. Toronto: self-published. ISBN 978-1-0695980-0-4.
