= Graham Towers =

1st governor of the Bank of Canada

Graham Towers CC CMG

1st Governor of the Bank of Canada
- In office 8 September 1934 – 31 December 1954
- Preceded by: Position established
- Succeeded by: James Coyne

Personal details
- Born: Graham Ford Towers; 29 September 1897 Montreal, Quebec, Canada
- Died: 4 December 1975 (aged 78) Ottawa, Ontario, Canada
- Spouse: Mary Scott Godfrey (m. 1924)
- Education: McGill University (BA, 1919)

Military service
- Allegiance: Canada
- Branch/service: Canadian Army
- Years of service: 1915–1918
- Rank: Lieutenant
- Unit: McGill COTC; 3rd Field Butchery, CASC
- Battles/wars: First World War

Graham Ford Towers CC CMG (29 September 1897 – 4 December 1975) was a Canadian economist who served as the first governor of the Bank of Canada from 1934 to 1954.

== Biography ==
Born in Montreal, Quebec, educated at St. Andrew's College in Toronto, graduating in 1913. He attended McGill University in 1915, and was a member of the University Canadian Officer Training Corps. In the summer of 1915 Towers left McGill for Stanley Barracks and Officer Training at Exhibition Place where he was commissioned a Provisional Lieutenant in the Canadian Army Service Corps on September 29, 1915. On December 8, Lt Towers passed his qualifying exam and obtained his Certificate in Equitation (Horsemanship). In March 1917, he joined the CEF and proceeded to France as a Railhead Supply Officer attached to the British 1st Army Headquarters. In late 1918 Lt Towers contracted Influenza and was shipped to Canada to recover. In the Spring of 1919 Towers returned to McGill University to study Law, graduating in December with a Bachelor of Arts degree with first class Honors in Economics and Political Science as a member of the Veterans Accelerated Class. He was discharged from the Canadian Army Service Corps on 13 September 1919.

During World War II, he was Chairman of the Foreign Exchange Control Board and Chairman of the National War Finance Committee. From 1944 to 1954, he was President of the Industrial Development Bank and from 1946 until 1954 he was alternate Governor for Canada at the International Monetary Fund. A long-time executive at the Royal Bank of Canada, he was a strong proponent of the creation the Bank of Canada, Canada's Central Bank. He led the Bank of Canada for twenty years before he was succeeded by James Coyne.

Towers was made a Companion of the Order of St Michael and St George in 1944. In 1969, he was made a Companion of the Order of Canada.

Towers provided evidence for the Canadian Government's Standing Committee on Banking and Commerce, in 1939 and revealed much about the way banking works in Canada. In one exchange with Gerry McGeer he is quoted as saying "If parliament wants to change the form of operating the banking system, then certainly that is within the power of parliament" when asked "Will you tell me why a government with power to create money, should give that power away to a private monopoly, and then borrow that which parliament can create itself, back at interest, to the point of national bankruptcy?"
