= Spiny, Poland =

Spiny
- Village
- Location within Poland
- Coordinates: 50°33′N 17°14′E
- Country: Poland
- Voivodeship: Opole
- County: Nysa
- Gmina: Pakosławice

Spiny [ˈspinɨ] (German: Spienau) is a village in the administrative district of Gmina Pakosławice, within Nysa County, Opole Voivodeship, in south-western Poland.
