= Canadian one-hundred-dollar note =

One of five banknotes of the Canadian dollar

One hundred dollars
- Country: Canada
- Value: 100 Canadian dollars
- Width: 152.4 mm
- Height: 69.85 mm
- Security features: Transparent windows, metallic portrait, EURion constellation, tactile marks, registration device, raised printing, UV printing
- Material used: Polymer

Obverse
- Design: Robert Borden

Reverse
- Design: "Medical Innovation"; discovery of insulin to treat diabetes; DNA strand; ECG (electrocardiogram)

The Canadian one-hundred-dollar note is one of five banknotes of the Canadian dollar. It is the highest-valued and least-circulated of the notes since the thousand-dollar note was gradually removed from circulation starting in 2000.

The current 100-dollar note was put into circulation through major banks in November 2011, made of a durable polymer instead of the traditional paper notes. The notes are dominantly brown in colour; the front design of the note features former prime minister Robert Borden and the design on the back depicts the discovery of insulin. Security features introduced into the note design include two transparent windows, which make the notes harder to forge than the traditional notes. One window extends from the top to the bottom of the note and has holographic images inlaid. The other window is in the shape of a maple leaf. Additional features include transparent text, a metallic portrait, raised ink, and partially hidden numbers. The note's design and change of material to a polymer (plastic) paper, for longevity and counterfeit prevention, was first announced on 10 March 2011. On 20 June 2011, Bank of Canada governor Mark Carney and Finance Minister Jim Flaherty unveiled the new $100 notes.

The previous 100-dollar note is dominantly brown in colour. It is still largely in circulation. The front features a portrait of Robert Borden, the coat of arms, and a picture of the East Block of the Parliament buildings. Security features visible from the front include a hologram strip along the left side, depicting the number 100 alternated with maple leaves; a watermark of Borden's portrait; and a broken-up number 100, which resolves itself when backlit. The reverse side depicts themes in Canadian exploration, including a map drawn by Samuel de Champlain and a canoe that would be used in his era, as well as a telecommunications antenna, the RADARSAT-1 satellite and a satellite image of Canada; it also has a quotation from Miriam Waddington's poem "Jacques Cartier in Toronto". The reverse also has a visible security feature: an interleaved metallic strip, reading '100 CAN' repeatedly along its length. Yellow dots representing the EURion constellation can be found on both sides (and on all 2001 series notes). As well as textured printing, this new 2004 design incorporates a special tactile feature similar to Braille dots for the blind indicating the denomination. This design was placed into circulation on 17 March 2004.

The older "Birds of Canada" design remained in circulation as of late 2004. It featured, on the front, a portrait of Sir Robert Borden, the coat of arms, and a picture of the Centre Block of Parliament. On the reverse side was a wilderness scene with Canada geese. It also had a holographic sticker showing the amount in the top left side, which changes from gold to green when tilted. The front had a wavy background of extremely small but still clear numeral 100s. This "micro-printed" background is very hard to copy. Some of the printing on a 100 is textured so that it is easy to feel, quite different from normal printing.

All Canadian banknotes underwent a major redesign in 1986, partially to incorporate some of the latest anti-forgery methods. Notes continue to be improved, with the latest notes made of a plastic material. Previously, notes were printed on paper composed of pure cotton at two Ottawa companies contracted for the purpose. They are the Canadian Bank Note Company and BA International Inc., a part of the Giesecke & Devrient GmbH group of companies.

Each note in the 1988 series was sprinkled with special green ink dots that glow when exposed to ultraviolet light. The ink can be scraped off, so worn notes tend to have fewer if any, glowing dots. These were replaced with more permanent ultraviolet-detected threads in the new notes, as well as an ink imprint of the coat of arms.

Despite these numerous security features, many small and medium and even some large-sized Canadian retailers continue to implement policies wherein $100 notes are not accepted for use in customer transactions – such a policy is usually not only due to counterfeiting concerns but also theft concerns and to reduce the amount of cash needed to be kept on hand for change.

On 12 July 2012, it was reported that under certain conditions, these and the Canadian fifty-dollar note would shrink under intense heat.

On 18 August 2012, the Bank of Canada replaced an image of an Asian woman on the back of the notes with that of a European looking woman in response to the concerns from focus group participants about the stereotyping of Asians as excelling in technology. This led to a further controversy when the redesign was accused of favouring a white person as more neutral, causing an apology from Governor Mark Carney.

As with all modern Canadian banknotes, all text is in both English and French.

Series	Series year	Main colour	Obverse	Reverse	Issued	Withdrawn
1935	1935	Dark brown	Prince Henry, Duke of Gloucester	Commerce and industry allegory	11 March 1935	
1937	1937	Brown	John A. Macdonald	Commerce and industry allegory	19 July 1937	
Canadian Landscape	1954	Brown	Elizabeth II	Okanagan Lake, view north from Campbell Mountain, British Columbia	9 September 1954	
Scenes of Canada	1975	Brown	Robert Borden	Lunenburg Harbour, Nova Scotia	31 May 1976	3 December 1990
Birds of Canada	1988	Brown	Robert Borden	Canada goose	3 December 1990	17 March 2004
Canadian Journey	2004	Brown	Robert Borden	Maps of Canada, and an excerpt from Miriam Waddington's poem, "Jacques Cartier in Toronto"	17 March 2004	14 November 2011
Frontier	2011	Brown	Robert Borden	Medical research, a DNA double helix, and a vial of insulin	14 November 2011	
