= Canadian five-dollar note =

Canadian banknote

Five dollars
- Country: Canada
- Value: 5 Canadian dollars
- Width: 152.4 mm
- Height: 69.85 mm
- Security features: Holographic stripe, watermark, EURion constellation, tactile marks, registration device, raised printing, UV printing
- Material used: Polymer

Obverse
- Design: Portrait: Wilfrid Laurier, prime minister from 1896 to 1911
- Design date: 25 March 2013

Reverse
- Design: Canadarm2 and Dextre
- Design date: 25 March 2013

The Canadian five-dollar note is the lowest denomination and one of the most common banknotes of the Canadian dollar.

As with all modern Canadian banknotes, all text is in both English and French.

== Frontier series note ==
The most recent Canadian five-dollar note, part of the Frontier series, is predominantly blue and was introduced 7 November 2013, using the same technology found in the other notes of that series. The bill features a portrait of Canada's seventh prime minister, Wilfrid Laurier, and a hologram of the Mackenzie Tower from the West Block on Parliament Hill on the front; the back features an astronaut working with Dextre attached to the Canadarm2.

This note features raised, textured printing as well as a special tactile feature (similar to Braille dots) to assist the blind in identifying the denomination. Security features include "Bank of Canada" and "Banque du Canada" visible only under ultraviolet light, and yellow dots representing the EURion constellation on the reverse side.

On December 16, 2024, the Bank of Canada announced that famed Canadian athlete and cancer research advocate Terry Fox will be the new face of the bill.

== Canadian Journey note ==
The front of the previous note, from the Canadian Journey series, also features Wilfrid Laurier, the coat of arms, and a picture of the West Block of the Parliament buildings, but in a different layout from the Frontier series note. The reverse side depicts children engaged in winter sports, including sledding, ice skating, and hockey; this is accompanied by a quotation from Roch Carrier's 1979 short story, "The Hockey Sweater":

Les hivers de mon enfance étaient des saisons longues, longues. Nous vivions en trois lieux: l'école, l'église et la patinoire; mais la vraie vie était sur la patinoire.

The winters of my childhood were long, long seasons. We lived in three places—the school, the church and the skating rink—but our real life was on the skating rink.

In the image, one of the hockey players, notably a girl, wears a hockey sweater number 9 to honour Canadian hockey legend Maurice Richard, idolized in Carrier's story.

== Series history ==
Series	Main colour	Obverse	Reverse	Series year	Issued	Withdrawn
1935 Series	Orange	Edward, Prince of Wales	Electric power allegory	1935	11 March 1935	
1937 Series	Blue	George VI	Electric power allegory	1937	19 July 1937	
1954 Series	Blue	Elizabeth II	Otter Falls (Aishihik River), Yukon	1954	9 September 1954	
Scenes of Canada	Blue	Wilfrid Laurier	Salmon seiner BCP 45 in Johnstone Strait, British Columbia	1972	4 December 1972	1 October 1979
Scenes of Canada	Blue	Wilfrid Laurier	Salmon seiner BCP 45 in Johnstone Strait, British Columbia	1979	1 October 1979	28 April 1986
Birds of Canada	Blue	Wilfrid Laurier	Belted kingfisher	1986	28 April 1986	27 March 2002
Canadian Journey	Blue	Wilfrid Laurier	Children playing hockey, tobogganing, and skating; excerpt from "The Hockey Sweater" by Roch Carrier	2002	27 March 2002	15 November 2006
Canadian Journey	Blue	Wilfrid Laurier	Children playing hockey, tobogganing, and skating; excerpt from "The Hockey Sweater" by Roch Carrier	2006	15 November 2006	7 November 2013
Frontier	Blue	Wilfrid Laurier	Canadarm2 and Dextre	2013	7 November 2013	

== Five-dollar coin ==
In 2005, the Canadian government polled its citizens on the idea of retiring the five-dollar note, replacing it with a five-dollar coin. The money saved in making the coin would then fund the Canadian Olympic team. Canadians resoundingly rejected and ridiculed the idea of a five-dollar coin. Some pointed out the note's most recent redesign took place only four years prior, while many others were averse to the idea of carrying yet another coin in their wallets and pockets. Due to the overwhelmingly negative response, plans for the five-dollar coin were discarded. Instead, on 15 November 2006, the Bank of Canada released an updated version of the five-dollar note (issue of 2006) with updated security features, including a holographic stripe found in the rest of the series, and a watermark of Laurier that appears when held to the light. These features replaced the iridescent maple leaves that were in the issue of 2002.

== "Spocking Fives" ==
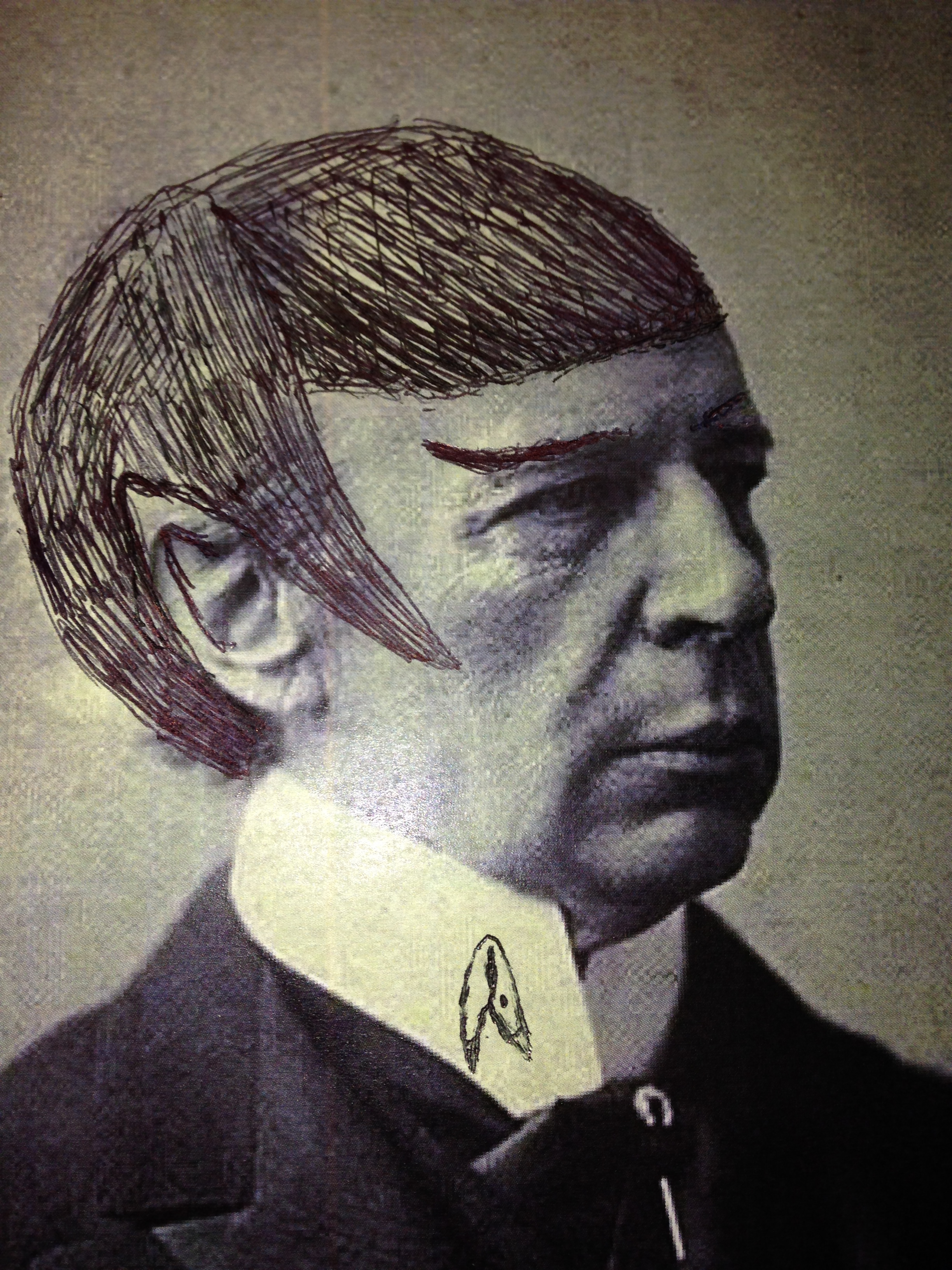
An example of "Spocking" using a portrait of Laurier from 1907, a similar portrait to the one used on the Canadian Journey Series $5-bill.

For years, Canadians have been known to deface certain editions of the five-dollar note by using ink pens to alter Laurier's features to resemble Spock, the Star Trek character originally portrayed by Leonard Nimoy. In 2002, the Bank of Canada officially objected to "any mutilation or defacement of banknotes", which could shorten the lifespan of the currency. When "Spocking" surged in 2015 following Nimoy's death, the Bank reminded people that, while the practice is not illegal and the notes remain legal tender and "a symbol of our country and a source of national pride", defacing the bill could damage its security features and lead retailers to refuse them. The 2013 issue of the note features an image of Laurier with less resemblance to Spock.

== Polymer notes ==
In 2020, a short-list of eight "bank NOTE-able" Canadians to be portrayed on the $5 vertical polymer bills in place of Laurier was selected from 600 nominees: Terry Fox, Crowfoot, Pitseolak Ashoona, Robertine Barry, Binaaswi, Won Alexander Cumyow, Lotta Hitschmanova and Fred Loft, with the final decision to be made by the Minister of Finance. In 2023, it was reported that Laurier will stay on the five-dollar bill for some time. On December 16, 2024, it was announced that the image of Terry Fox would be replacing Laurier's image on the next edition of the $5 banknote, with an image of Laurier being used for the $50 note when a new design of that note is implemented.
