= Canadian ten-dollar note =

Canadian banknote

Ten dollars
(Canada)
- Value: 10 Canadian dollars
- Width: 69.85 mm
- Height: 152.4 mm
- Security features: Holographic stripe, watermark, EURion constellation, tactile marks, registration device, raised printing, UV printing
- Material used: Polymer
- Years of printing: 2018–present

Obverse
- Design: Viola Desmond, with a map showing Halifax in the background
- Designer: Canadian Bank Note Company
- Design date: 2018

Reverse
- Design: The Canadian Museum for Human Rights, accompanied by an eagle feather
- Designer: Canadian Bank Note Company
- Design date: 2018

The Canadian ten-dollar note is one of the most common banknotes of the Canadian dollar.

The current $10 note is purple, and the obverse features a portrait of Viola Desmond, a Black Nova Scotian businesswoman who challenged racial segregation at a film theatre in New Glasgow, Nova Scotia, in 1946. The background of the portrait is a colourful rendition of the street grid of Halifax, Nova Scotia, including the waterfront, Citadel and Gottingen Street, where Desmond's Studio of Beauty Culture was located. Foil features on the note face include both the Flag and Coat of Arms of Canada. This is the first Canadian banknote to feature neither a prime minister nor a royal in its solo portrait, and the first to feature a solo female Canadian other than Queen Elizabeth II. (Note: Two other women members of the Canadian royal family—Queen Mary and her daughter, Princess Mary, Princess Royal and Countess of Harewood—appeared on the 1935 Canadian banknote series. However, the concept of a Canadian royal family and its members being Canadian was, at the time, in its naissance, the Statute of Westminster 1931 having been enacted only four years earlier.)

The reverse features the Canadian Museum for Human Rights in Winnipeg, Manitoba. Part of the background pattern mirrors the museum's interior architecture and its ramps connecting multiple levels. A foil eagle feather is prominent, symbolizing ideals such as truth, power and freedom. A quotation from section 15 of the Canadian Charter of Rights and Freedoms appears in both English and French.

The foil window at the base of the note includes an iridescent rendering of the Library of Parliament's vaulted dome ceiling, which can be seen from both sides of the note.

The vertical $10 note entered circulation on November 19, 2018.

| Series | Main colour | Obverse | Reverse | Series year | Issued | Withdrawn |
|---|---|---|---|---|---|---|
| 1935 series | Purple | Mary, Princess Royal and Countess of Harewood | Harvest allegory | 1935 | 11 March 1935 | |
| 1937 series | Purple | George VI | Transportation allegory | 1937 | 19 July 1937 | |
| Canadian Landscape | Purple | Elizabeth II | Mount Burgess, British Columbia | 1954 | 9 September 1954 | |
| Scenes of Canada | Purple | John A. Macdonald | Polymer Corporation oil refinery in Sarnia, Ontario | 1971 | 8 November 1971 | 27 June 1989 |
| Birds of Canada | Purple | John A. Macdonald | Osprey | 1989 | 27 June 1989 | 17 January 2001 |
| Canadian Journey | Purple | John A. Macdonald | Peacekeeping forces and war memorial; poppy field and excerpt from "In Flanders Fields" by John McCrae | 2001 | 17 January 2001 | 18 May 2005 |
| Canadian Journey | Purple | John A. Macdonald | Peacekeeping forces and war memorial; poppy field and excerpt from "In Flanders Fields" by John McCrae | 2005 | 18 May 2005 | 7 November 2013 |
| Frontier | Purple | John A. Macdonald | The Canadian passenger train | 2013 | 7 November 2013 | |
| Commemorative issue | Purple | John A. Macdonald, George-Étienne Cartier, Agnes MacPhail, James Gladstone | Variety of Canadian vistas | 2017 | 1 June 2017 | |
| Vertical | Purple | Viola Desmond | Canadian Museum for Human Rights | 2018 | 19 November 2018 | |
