= Canadian fifty-dollar note =

Canadian banknote

Fifty dollars
- Country: Canada
- Value: 50 Canadian dollars
- Width: 152.4 mm
- Height: 69.85 mm
- Security features: Transparent windows, metallic portrait, watermark, EURion constellation, tactile marks, registration device, raised printing, UV printing
- Material used: Polymer

Obverse
- Design: William Lyon Mackenzie King

Reverse
- Design: CCGS Amundsen; arctic in Inuktitut; map of the northern regions of Canada

The Canadian fifty-dollar note is one of the most common banknotes of the Canadian dollar. It is sometimes dispensed by ATMs but not as commonly as the $20 note.

From the Frontier (2011–present) series. The current 50-dollar note is predominantly red in colour and is printed on polymer (plastic), not paper. In addition to being more durable than the cotton-based paper they replaced, the new notes are also more secure. It was introduced into circulation on March 26, 2012 and is part of the new Polymer Series (2011). The front features a portrait of William Lyon Mackenzie King. A large clear window runs vertically on the right hand side of the face of the note. There is a second metallic hologram image of King on the top of the window, and a hologram image of the Centre Block of the Canadian Parliament buildings on the bottom of the window. A ribbon made of multiple number 50s weaves between the duplicate King portrait and the Centre Block. The top left corner of the note's face has a metallic maple leaf surrounded by a transparent border.

The reverse side depicts the Canadian Coast Guard Ship (CCGS) Amundsen, a research icebreaker. Because the note is plastic, the same clear windows and metallic images that are seen on the front are seen on the reverse. As well as textured printing, this design incorporates a special tactile feature similar to Braille dots for the blind indicating the denomination.

From the Canadian Journey (2004) series. It features, on the front, a portrait of William Lyon Mackenzie King, the coat of arms, and a picture of the Peace Tower of the Parliament buildings. Security features visible from the front include a hologram strip along the left side, depicting the number 50 alternated with maple leaves; a watermark of King's portrait; and a broken-up number 50, which resolves itself when backlit. The reverse side depicts themes in Canadian human rights history, such as the Famous Five celebrating the Persons case, and a volunteer medal commemorating Thérèse Casgrain; it also has a quotation from the Universal Declaration of Human Rights. The reverse also has a visible security feature: an interleaved metallic strip, reading '50 CAN' repeatedly along its length.

From the Birds of Canada (1988) series. It features, on the front, a portrait of William Lyon Mackenzie King, the coat of arms, and a picture of the Centre Block of Parliament. On the reverse side is a wilderness scene with a snowy owl. It also had a holographic sticker showing the amount in the top left side, which changes from gold to green when tilted. The front has a wavy background of extremely small but still clear numeral 50s. This "micro-printed" background is very hard to copy. Some of the printing is textured, and the raised ink can be felt.

All Canadian banknotes underwent a major redesign, beginning in 1986, partially to incorporate some of the latest anti-forgery methods. Notes continued to be improved, and the design was placed into circulation on November 17, 2004. Notes were printed on paper composed of pure cotton at two Ottawa companies contracted for the purpose: the Canadian Bank Note Company and BA International Inc., a part of the Giesecke & Devrient GmbH group of companies.

Each $50 banknote in the 1988 series was sprinkled with special green ink dots that glow when exposed to ultraviolet light. The ink can be scraped off, so worn notes tend to have fewer, if any, glowing dots. These were replaced with more permanent ultraviolet-detected threads in the new notes, as well as an ink imprint of the coat of arms.

On December 16, 2024, it was announced that the image of Wilfrid Laurier would be used for the next $50 banknote design and that Terry Fox's image would replace his on the $5 note. There was no announcement about King's image being used on a different note.

As on all modern Canadian banknotes, all text is written in both English and French.

Series	Main colour	Obverse	Reverse	Series Year	Issued	Withdrawn
1935 Series	Brown	Prince Albert, Duke of York	Modern Inventions allegory	1935	11 March 1935	
1937 Series	Orange	George VI	Modern Inventions allegory	1937	19 July 1937	
1954 Series	Orange	Elizabeth II	Lockeport Beach, Nova Scotia	1954	9 September 1954	
Scenes of Canada	Red	William Lyon Mackenzie King	Musical Ride of the Royal Canadian Mounted Police	1975	31 March 1975	1 December 1989
Birds of Canada	Red	William Lyon Mackenzie King	Snowy owl	1988	1 December 1989	17 November 2004
Canadian Journey Series	Red	William Lyon Mackenzie King	The Famous Five and Thérèse Casgrain; quotation from the Universal Declaration of Human Rights	2004	17 November 2004	26 March 2012
Frontier Series	Red	William Lyon Mackenzie King	CCGS Amundsen in arctic waters, a map of Canada's North, and the word 'Arctic' in Inuktitut (ᐅᑭᐅᖅᑕᖅᑐᖅ, ukiuqtaqtuq)	2012	26 March 2012	
