= 1937 Canadian banknote series =

The 1937 Canadian banknote series is the second series of banknotes of the Canadian dollar issued by the Bank of Canada. The banknotes were issued into circulation on 19 July 1937, at which time the Bank of Canada began gradually removing banknotes from the 1935 series from circulation. The $1000 banknote was issued several years later, as it was primarily used by chartered banks, which had a sufficient supply of the 1935 Series $1000 banknote.

This was the first series of bilingual Canadian banknotes, as the 1935 Series was a dual-language series with French banknotes issued in Quebec and English banknotes issued in the rest of Canada. This series was created because of the introduction of the Bank of Canada Act, which required Canadian banknotes to be bilingual. In this series, English was always on the left. The 1937 banknote series was followed by the 1954 Canadian Landscape series.

With the exception of the $50 and $1000 notes, the colours introduced to the notes on this series remain to this day (or until they were no longer produced).

== Background ==
In the House of Commons on 2 June 1936, Conservative member of parliament Thomas Langton Church protested against the requirement of bilingual banknotes in the Bank of Canada Act, stating there was no authority for it in the British North America Act, and that it had not been an issue during the 1935 federal election. He favoured printing dual-language banknotes (distinct English and French banknotes) as had been done for the 1935 Series. Other conservative members of the 18th Canadian Parliament, such as Robert Smeaton White, supported the Liberal Party of Canada majority government of William Lyon Mackenzie King to print bilingual banknotes.

The death of George V on 20 January 1936 was another factor for the Bank of Canada to introduce a new series of banknotes. It created designs for new banknotes incorporating the portrait of Edward VIII, but when he abdicated on 11 December 1936 in order to marry Wallis Simpson, the Bank of Canada rushed to prepare new designs. These used portraits of King George VI, who ascended the throne on 11 December 1936.

== Banknotes ==
The banknotes retain the "classical elements of the design" of the 1935 Series, and the reverse of most banknote denominations retain the allegorical themes and figures of the 1935 Series. The design of these banknotes has greater uniformity and consistency than the 1935 Series, with the obverse having a framed numeral in the top corners and the written value of each denomination framed in the lower corners, with English on the right and French on the left. The allegorical figures have the same frame in each denomination, unlike the 1935 Series, and are flanked by a large framed numeral representing the denomination's value.

In 1938, the designs were modified to mitigate printing problems of the original design, increasing the width of the signature panel by 2.4 mm. All banknotes in the series measure 152.4 by 73.025 millimetres (6.000 by 2.875 in).

Denomination	Face Image	Back Image	Colour	Face	Back	Printed	Issued
$1			Green	King George VI	Agriculture allegory	2 January 1937	19 July 1937
$2			Terra cotta	King George VI	Harvest allegory	2 January 1937	19 July 1937
$5			Blue	King George VI	Electric power allegory	2 January 1937	19 July 1937
$10			Purple	King George VI	Transportation allegory	2 January 1937	19 July 1937
$20			Olive green	King George VI	Fertility allegory	2 January 1937	19 July 1937
$50			Orange	King George VI	Modern Inventions allegory	2 January 1937	19 July 1937
$100			Sepia	John A. Macdonald	Commerce and industry allegory	2 January 1937	19 July 1937
$1000			Rose pink	Wilfrid Laurier	Security allegory	2 January 1937	January 1952

Each denomination had a distinct colour, and this set of denomination colours would be used for all subsequent banknote series. The Bank of Canada modified the colours used from the 1935 Series in part to address the issue that some banknotes could not be easily distinguished in low light. This was particularly problematic for the $1 and $2 banknotes, which The St. Maurice Valley Chronicle of Trois-Rivières stated in an article that the green hue of the $1 banknote and the blue hue of the $2 banknote made the obverse appear similar, and that the more distinct colours of the reverse could be "confused in artificial light". The Bank of Canada chose to design the $2 banknotes using a terracotta red called "sanguine" as its dominant colour, and also changed the colour of the $5 banknote to blue, the $20 banknote to olive green, the $50 banknote to orange, and the $100 banknote to the same tint of sepia used for the 1935 Series $500 banknote.

=== Portraits ===
The series only contained three portraits, which were centrally positioned on the obverse of the banknote on which they were included to accommodate the introduction of bilingual text. The portrait of George VI wearing an admiral's uniform appearing on six of the banknotes was based on a photograph taken by Bertram Park, for which an engraving was made by Robert Savage of ABN. It had been used on the $50 banknote of the 1935 Series. The two exceptions were the $100 banknote, which had the same portrait of John A. Macdonald as the 1935 Series $100 banknote, and the $1000 banknote, which had the same portrait of Wilfrid Laurier as the 1935 Series $100 banknote.

=== Allegories ===
The allegorical figure on the $1 banknote was the same as that on the 1935 Series $1 banknote, depicting an agricultural theme. It was based on a painting by Alonzo Foringer of the American Bank Note Company (ABN). The $2 banknote contains the same harvest allegory that appeared on the 1935 Series $10 banknote, and was engraved by Harry P. Dawson of the British American Bank Note Company (BABN, now BA International).

The $5 banknote has the same electric power generation allegory that appeared in the 1935 Series $5 banknote, and the $10 banknote has the same transportation allegory as the 1935 Series $2 banknote, represented by a winged figure of the Roman mythological character Mercury. The same fertility allegory that was on the 1935 Series $500 banknote, based on another painting by Foringer, was used on the $20 banknote of this series. The modern inventions allegorical figure on the $50 banknote, industry allegorical figure of the $100 banknote, and security allegorical figure of the $1000 banknote were the same as those used on the same denomination in the 1935 Series.

== Printing ==
Engravings of the banknotes were created and subsequently transferred to steel rollers by rocking the rollers back and forth over the engraved die. After being hardened, the design was transferred to a master printing plate, which for the 1937 Series contained 24 copies of the engraved image. This process is known as siderography. The original plates, dies, and rolls for this series were destroyed by the Canadian Bank Note Company (CBN) after the modified version of the series was created in 1938.

The Canadian Bank Note Company printed the $1, $20, $50, $100, and $1000 banknotes, and the British American Bank Note Company printed the $2, $5, and $10 banknotes.

== Legacy ==
Ultimately, the "production of bilingual notes was widely endorsed by parliamentarians and by the public".

Because the colour of the $5 banknote was changed to blue, the Bank of Canada "recalled and cancelled 3,644,000" of the 1935 series blue $2 banknotes to avoid confusion. The $2 banknotes were rarely used in the prairie provinces of Canada as that denomination had "never been popular" there since its use in the 1920s as the standard price for a prostitute along the "notorious River Street hotel strip" in Moose Jaw, earning it the nickname Moose Jaw money. This denomination would be shunned by many in the prairie provinces until the 1990s, when $2 banknotes of the Birds of Canada series became increasingly accepted.

By 1940, CA$495,946,232 worth of banknotes were in circulation, of which CA$379,000,000 was held by the public and the remainder by chartered banks. This reflected an increase of CA$95,000,000 in 1940 and CA$109,000,000 in 1941. Most denominations had a static circulation pattern, with increasing scarcity for successively larger denominations. The $2 banknote, however, had no discernable pattern of use, fluctuating from abundance to scarcity. In January and February 1949, for example, Montreal and Toronto experienced large spikes (also referred to as "jags") in the use of $2 banknotes for financial transactions, and as the spike subsided over two weeks, another one appeared in Ottawa. The Bank of Canada made an official statement about the phenomenon, for which it could provide no explanation, stating that the $2 banknotes "come like migratory birds and disappear like the lemmings".

A memorandum written by Donald Gordon, Deputy Governor of the Bank of Canada, stated a preference to produce a new series of banknotes every five years to "obstruct any attempt at wholesale counterfeiting", but the plan was abandoned because of World War II.
