= Birds of Canada (banknotes) =

1986 Canadian banknote series

Face sides of the 1986 Birds of Canada series depicting, top to bottom, Queen Elizabeth II, Wilfrid Laurier, John A. Macdonald, Queen Elizabeth II, William Lyon Mackenzie King, Robert Borden and again Queen Elizabeth II

Birds of Canada (French: oiseaux du Canada) is the fifth series of banknotes of the Canadian dollar issued by the Bank of Canada and was first circulated in 1986 to replace the 1969 Scenes of Canada series. Each note features a bird indigenous to Canada in its design. The birds on the bills were: American Robin ($2 bill), belted kingfisher ($5 bill), osprey ($10 bill), common loon ($20 bill), snowy owl ($50 bill), Canada goose ($100 bill), and pine grosbeak ($1000 bill). The banknotes weigh 1 gram with dimensions of 152.40 by 69.85 millimetres (6.00 by 2.75 in). The series was succeeded by the 2001 Canadian Journey series.

This was the first series to omit the $1 banknote; it was replaced by the $1 coin, which became known as the loonie, in 1987, although the $1 bill from the previous series would continue to be produced concurrently with the $1 coin for a 21-month long period until 1989. It was the last series to include the $2 and $1,000 banknotes. The $2 note was withdrawn in 1996 and replaced by the $2 coin now known as the toonie. The $1,000 note was withdrawn by the Bank of Canada in 2000 as part of a program to mitigate money laundering and organized crime.

The portraits on the front of the note were made larger than those of previous series. The $20, $50, $100, and $1000 banknotes had a colour-shifting metallic foil security patch on the upper left corner, an optical security device that was difficult to reproduce with the commercial reproduction equipment of the time. This was the last Canadian banknote series to include planchettes as a security feature.

This series was the first to include a bar code with the serial number. This allows the visually impaired to determine the denomination of a banknote using a hand-held device distributed by the bank of Canada for free via the Canadian National Institute for the Blind.

== Design ==
The Bank of Canada began preparations for design of this series in 1974. A 1981 Parliamentary committee recommending design features enabling visually impaired individuals to determine the denomination of a banknote influenced the design process for the banknotes. In 1983, the Bank of Canada chose to use "clear, uncluttered images" of Canadian birds for the reverse. This imparted on the banknotes additional security against counterfeiting, as the design had a "single, large focal point" that enabled easier detection of counterfeits compared to the complex designs of earlier banknote series.

The banknote design contains distinct colours for each denomination, and large numerals on the obverse and reverse of each denomination, both of which facilitate quick identification. A patch of about 4.75 square millimetres (0.01 sq in) width at the edge of the central banner enables blind people to determine the denomination of a banknote using an electronic device and emit an audible output to indicate it, except for the $1000 banknote. On the reverse, vertical bars adjacent to the serial number are used by banknote sorting machines for quick identification to enable high-speed sorting.

== Production ==
In 1984, the Bank of Canada announced that production of banknotes would be revised to require 100% cotton fibre, eliminating the 25% flax content requirement. Domestic flax producers in the Prairie provinces were upset by the change, which would result in a loss of revenue of about CA$40,000. A Bank of Canada spokesman stated the change was necessary to satisfy pollution control standards, as raw flax processing uses chemicals eventually released as effluent.

The printing process required three lithographic plates and one intaglio plate for the obverse, and three lithographic plates for the reverse.

== Banknotes ==
The obverse of four banknotes feature a Prime Minister of Canada, whereas the others feature Elizabeth II. The design on the reverse of each note features a bird indigenous to Canada with a background representing the typical landscape for that bird. The birds represented in the series are found throughout Canada, and their colouring complements the dominant colour of the denomination on which they appear. In a Toronto Star article in 1990, Christopher Hume stated that having a bird on each denomination "adds an element of consistency to the series". Each banknote weighs 1 gram (0.035 oz) with dimensions of 152.40 by 69.85 millimetres (6.00 by 2.75 in).

As of November 2013, all banknotes in this series are considered unfit for circulation by the Bank of Canada, as none of the banknotes contain modern security features like that of a metallic stripe. Financial institutions must return the banknotes to the Bank of Canada, which will destroy them. Individuals may keep the banknotes indefinitely.

Value	Main colour	Obverse	Reverse	Series Year	Issued	Withdrawn
$2	Terra cotta	Elizabeth II	American robins	1986	2 September 1986	16 February 1996
$5	Blue	Wilfrid Laurier	Belted kingfisher	1986	28 April 1986	27 March 2002
$10	Purple	John A. Macdonald	Osprey	1989	27 June 1989	17 January 2001
$20	Green	Elizabeth II	Common loon	1991	29 June 1993	29 September 2004
$50	Red	William Lyon Mackenzie King	Snowy owl	1988	1 December 1989	17 November 2004
$100	Brown	Robert Borden	Canada goose	1988	3 December 1990	17 March 2004
$1000	Pink	Elizabeth II	Pine grosbeak	1988	4 May 1992	12 May 2000

=== $2 note ===
The obverse and reverse of the Birds of Canada $2 banknote

The $2 banknote has an obverse featuring Elizabeth II, the Queen of Canada at the time of its introduction on 2 September 1986. A photograph by Anthony Buckley was the basis of the portrait, which was engraved by Henry S. Doubtfire of De La Rue. Adjacent to the portrait is a vignette of the Parliament buildings. The reverse of the terra cotta banknote features American robins. This note would be the last Canadian $2 banknote, as the government announced during the 1995 Canadian federal budget speech that it would be withdrawn from circulation. It was withdrawn on 16 February 1996 and was replaced by a $2 coin, colloquially referred to as the toonie.

One of five known $2 banknotes with a serial number containing the prefix sequence "AUH" was auctioned in September 2012 for CA$10,000.

=== $5 note ===
The obverse and reverse of the Birds of Canada $5 banknote

The obverse of the blue $5 banknote included a rendering of Wilfrid Laurier, and the bird on the reverse is the Belted Kingfisher. The portrait was engraved by Yves Baril, and to its right is a vignette of the Centre Block as it appeared during Laurier's premiership flying the Canadian Red Ensign, the flag of Canada at the time.

The banknote was the first of this series to be introduced, on 28 April 1986. It was withdrawn on 27 March 2002.

=== $10 note ===
The obverse and reverse of the Birds of Canada $10 banknote

The prime minister featured on the $10 banknote obverse is John A. Macdonald, whose portrait was engraved by Thomas Hipschen of the Bureau of Engraving and Printing in the United States. Adjacent to the portrait is a vignette of the buildings of Parliament as they were during his premiership, flying the Canadian Red Ensign. The bird featured on the reverse is an Eastern Osprey. The purple banknote was introduced on 27 June 1989 and withdrawn on 17 January 2001.

=== $20 note ===
The obverse and reverse of the Birds of Canada $20 banknote

The green $20 banknote has an obverse featuring Elizabeth II, the same engraving used for the $2 banknote, and a reverse featuring two Common Loons. The building vignette adjacent to the portrait is the Library of Parliament. The image of the loons was intended for a $1 banknote, but when it was decided to replace that with the $1 loonie coin, the image was instead used for the $20 banknote.

It was introduced on 29 June 1993, making it the last of the series to be introduced, and withdrawn on 29 September 2004. In 2003, high-quality counterfeits of the banknote appeared in circulation in Ontario and Quebec.

=== $50 note ===
The obverse and reverse of the Birds of Canada $50 banknote

The obverse of the red $50 banknote includes William Lyon Mackenzie King, and the reverse has the Snowy Owl depicted on a background of an Arctic landscape. This portrait was also engraved by Thomas Hipschen, and was placed adjacent to the Parliament buildings flying the Canadian Red Ensign. The colour of this banknote differed slightly from the same denomination in the Scenes of Canada series, as its hue was blue-red instead of the earlier banknotes orange-red.

Introduced on 1 December 1989 and withdrawn on 17 November 2004, the $50 bill was the last banknote of the series to cease being printed. It was the first Canadian banknote to feature the optical security device.

=== $100 note ===
The obverse and reverse of the Birds of Canada $100 banknote

Robert Borden is featured on the obverse of the brown $100 banknote, which has the Canada Goose on its reverse. Yves Baril also engraved this portrait, and the banknote also depicts a vignette of the Centre Block with the Peace Tower flying the Union Jack, which was flown on all federal buildings from 1904 to 1945.

The banknote was introduced on 3 December 1990 and withdrawn on 17 March 2004. Many merchants, including Food Basics, Jumbo Video, McDonald's Canada, No Frills, Shoppers Drug Mart, and Tim Hortons, stopped accepting the $100 banknote in 2001 as it became increasingly counterfeited.

By 2013, counterfeit versions of the banknote represented half of all counterfeit banknotes in circulation in Quebec, and 80% of all counterfeit $100 banknotes in the province.

=== $1000 note ===
The obverse and reverse of the Birds of Canada $1000 banknote

The pink-hued $1000 banknote has an obverse with the same portrait of Elizabeth II used on the $2 banknote adjacent to a vignette of the Centre Block and Library of Parliament, the modern flag of Canada flying from the Peace Tower. The reverse features a pair of Pine Grosbeaks, the engraving of which was based on a watercolour by John Crosby. Originally, it was intended to use an image of a spruce grouse, but its nickname "fool hen" was "considered too controversial". This was the first new $1000 bill printed since the 1954 Canadian Landscape series.

The banknotes were often referred to as "pinkies" because of their colour. On average, a $1000 banknote remained in circulation for 13 years owing to its infrequent use. It was released on 4 May 1992. The banknote was withdrawn from circulation by the Government of Canada on 12 May 2000 at the request of the Bank of Canada, the Department of Finance, and the Royal Canadian Mounted Police (RCMP) as part of a program to reduce organized crime. At the time, 2,827,702 of the $1000 bills were in circulation, representing 0.3% of all circulating currency; in 2001, 520,000 banknotes were withdrawn from circulation and destroyed. By 2011, fewer than 1 million were in circulation, most of which were held by organized crime and used for money laundering.

=== Printings ===
Each printing of the banknote series is signed by the Governor of the Bank of Canada and the deputy governor.

Governor	Deputy Governor	Printing years	Denominations
Gerald Bouey	John Crow	1986–1987	$2, $5
John Crow	Gordon Thiessen	1987–1994	$2, $5, $10, $20, $50, $100, $1000
Gordon Thiessen	Bernard Bonin	1994–1999	$2, $5, $10, $20, $50, $100, $1000
Gordon Thiessen	Malcolm Knight	1999–2001	$5, $10, $20, $50, $100
David A. Dodge	Malcolm Knight	2001	$5, $20, $50, $100

The Canadian Bank Note Company (CBN) printed the $2, $5, $20, $50, and $1000 banknotes, and the British American Bank Note Company printed the $2, $10, $20, and $100 banknotes.

== Security ==
All banknotes featured intaglio printing, microprinting and fine lines, fluorescence, and unique colours and serial numbers. The intaglio printing is raised ink appearing on the large numeral, the Arms of Canada, parts of the portrait, and the horizontal bands containing the words "BANK OF CANADA". The fine but clear microprinting cannot be easily reproduced by photocopiers and printers, and appears on the background patterns of the banknotes, the facial portion of the portraits, and in the vignette of the Parliament buildings. The colours used on the banknotes were based on security inks that could not be easily replicated.

The $20, $50, $100, and $1000 banknotes had a colour-shifting metallic foil security patch on the upper left corner, an optical security device that was difficult to reproduce with colour photocopiers and other commercial reproduction equipment of the time. It was a vacuum-deposited thin film consisting of ceramic layers developed by the Bank of Canada and the National Research Council of Canada in the early 1980s and was manufactured at the Bank of Canada roll-coating facility. The iridescent smooth patch would appear in a gradient between gold and green and show the face value of the banknote depending on the viewing angle, had no raised edges, and could not be peeled off the banknote. When photocopied, it would appear as a dark patch. All banknotes in the series were printed with a security ink that would fluoresce blue under ultraviolet light.

The banknotes also had a feature causing photocopiers recognizing it to refuse to copy the banknote, and a digital watermark which had the same effect on personal printers and scanners. These features had no effect on devices that could not recognize them.

This was the last Canadian banknote series to include planchettes, small green dots on the paper bills introduced in the 1935 Series (banknotes). These dots fluoresce blue under ultraviolet light and were used as a security feature. Some planchettes could be removed from legitimate bills, leaving a perfect bluish circle on the bill. Planchettes occurred with random position on both the obverse and reverse of banknotes, either on the surface or within the note.

In the mid 1990s, the Bank of Canada tested a new substrate for use in printing banknotes. It printed 100,000 experimental $5 banknotes having a substrate of polymer core with paper at the sides. The project was discontinued because the supplier could not produce the substrate at the scale required by the Bank of Canada for printing banknotes.

=== Counterfeiting ===
An attempt to create a faithful counterfeit reproduction of the $50 banknote using colour photocopiers was recorded in 1990. By the mid 1990s, counterfeiters had found a way to accurately reproduce the metallic foil. Counterfeit banknotes did not usually properly reproduce the fine lines and microprinting, rendering it as smudged or blurry.

The security features introduced in the Birds of Canada series led to a reduction in the counterfeit ratio of bills circulated in Canada to 4 parts per million (PPM) by 1990, one of the most secure currencies in the world. With the continuing advances in retail and commercial technology, by 1997 the counterfeit ratio had increased to 117 PPM, exceeding the 50 PPM de facto international benchmark. In late 2000, Wesley Weber scanned the $100 banknote, and for weeks used graphics software to correct the "fuzziness of the image" and improve its sharpness. He then conducted research to find a paper stock similar to that used for the real banknotes that would not fluoresce under ultraviolet light, and chose Mohawk Super Fine soft-white cotton fibre stock with eggshell finish. He used an inkjet printer to print three counterfeit bills per page, and stencilled onto each bill a metallic patch similar to the optical security device that he obtained from a company in New Jersey. He was arrested in 2001, by which time he had manufactured counterfeit banknotes with a face value of $6 million, and Canada's counterfeit ratio had increased to 129 PPM. That year, the Bank of Canada introduced the Canadian Journey Series, the banknotes of which were more resistant to counterfeiting.

In 2003, a high-quality counterfeit version of the $20 banknote was found in circulation in Ontario and Quebec. These counterfeit banknotes had been manufactured using "high quality paper, a manual hot foil-stamping machine, and airbrushing equipment" and die cut. Several Bulgarian counterfeiters were convicted and sentenced for counterfeiting the banknotes in December 2006. By 2004, counterfeit Birds of Canada $20 banknotes represented nearly 65% of all counterfeit currency in Canada.

Today, the Birds of Canada banknotes are relatively easy to counterfeit with inkjet printers. The Birds series and the original Canadian Journey Series are the most commonly counterfeited Canadian banknote series because of their lack of modern security features.

=== Effectiveness ===
The Bank of Canada commissioned a research survey of cash handlers and the general public to determine the effectiveness of the security features on the Birds of Canada and Canadian Journey series banknotes. The research found that participants correctly identified 84% of counterfeit banknotes based only on fluorescence features, 83% based only on microprinting and fine line features, and 80% based only on portrait features. Genuine banknotes were correctly identified 88%, 97%, and 89% of the time, respectively. The optical security device was the most effective security feature, used to correctly identify 98% of counterfeit banknotes and 95% of genuine banknotes.

Detecting counterfeits using only touch was 74% effective for the $10 banknote and 82% effective for the $20 banknote. Using only vision, counterfeit detection was 92% effective for the $10 banknote and 86% effective for the $20 banknote. Using both improved performance to 94% for both banknotes.

The general public correctly identified 72% of counterfeit banknotes, 80% of genuine $10 banknotes and 89% of genuine $20 banknotes. Commercial cash handlers, such as retail cashiers, correctly identified 86% of counterfeit banknotes, 89% of genuine $10 banknotes and 94% of genuine $20 banknotes. Bank tellers correctly identified 89% of counterfeit banknotes, 91% of genuine $10 banknotes and 95% of genuine $20 banknotes. All groups performed better with high-quality notes (that is, those that were clean and undamaged) with the exception that the general public misidentified many high-quality genuine $10 banknotes as counterfeit, which was attributed to the public's suspicion of new banknotes.

The participants performed better at identifying counterfeit Birds of Canada banknotes than identifying counterfeit Canadian Journey banknotes.

== Reception ==
A report by The Canadian Press stated that residents of Lunenburg were displeased with the design of the $100 banknote, as the reverse of the same denomination in the Scenes of Canada series featured a vignette of the fishing town. Many younger Canadians were unfamiliar with the Red Ensign, and thought the flag flown atop the buildings on the $5 and $10 banknote was the flag of the United States, precipitating media coverage known as the "flag flap".

Currency collectors stated that the optical security device was not aesthetically pleasing, and that its placement and appearance were poor. Some compared it to the Australian commemorative $10 note issued in 1988, which had a reflective holographic badge featuring James Cook, as an example of a more aesthetically pleasing design.

== Collecting ==
The Bank of Canada printed uncut sheets of the $5 banknotes with serial numbers between 6,000,000 and 6,939,999 and prefix ANU. Some of these were released for sale to collectors in 2002 when the Bank of Canada also issued the Lasting Impressions collectors set. This set contained two uncirculated $5 banknotes, one from this series and the other from the Canadian Journey Series, with matching serial numbers. The banknotes were in an embossed folder also containing an information booklet with the history of the denomination and the features of each banknote. A similar set for $10 banknotes had been released in 2001.

== Legacy ==
A study commissioned by the Bank of Canada in 1994 stated that about 8,000 blind Canadians do not benefit from the large numerals or distinct colouration of the banknotes. In 1990, the Bank of Canada, via the Canadian National Institute for the Blind, had begun distributing to these individuals a free electronic device capable of determining the denomination of a banknote by reading the vertical bars adjacent to the serial number. Each device cost the Bank of Canada about CA$300, and 50–60 devices were requested every month, mostly from elderly individuals who used the device at home.

Withdrawing the $1 banknote of earlier series and discontinuing printing of the $2 banknotes increased consumer use of the loonie and toonie. This decreased the costs of producing money and decreased the operational costs for some businesses, such as the Toronto Transit Commission, which estimated it would save CA$800,000 annually by not having to "unfold, sort, and count $1 bills".

The appearance of high-quality counterfeit $100 banknotes in 2001 from Windsor to Montreal resulted in about 10% of retailers to post signs that they would refuse to accept $100 banknotes in a cash transaction.
