= Crescent Beach, Lockeport, Nova Scotia =

Beach in Nova Scotia, Canada

Coordinates: 43.696207°N 65.119336°W

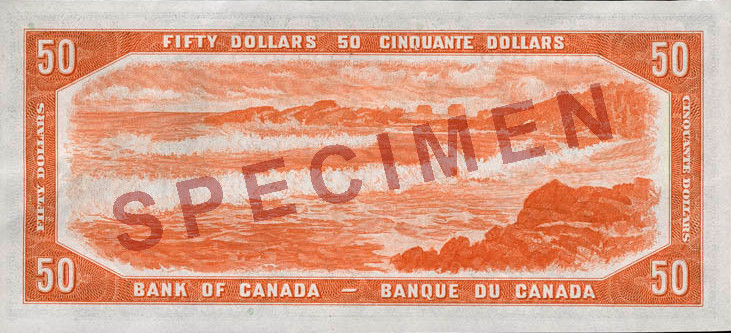
A seascape scene based on a photograph of Crescent Beach was engraved by Warrell Alfred Hauk for the $50 banknote of the 1954 Series

Crescent Beach is a white sand beach causeway in Lockeport, Nova Scotia, Canada, that connects the peninsula of Lockeport to mainland Nova Scotia. Due to the town's proximity to the beach and closeness to major shipping lanes, Lockeport is often referred to as the 'Beachtown of the North Atlantic'. Crescent Beach was featured on the Canadian 1954 series fifty-dollar bill. The scenery on the bill depicts a stormy day at Ginger Hill.

== Crescent Beach Centre ==
The Crescent Beach is also home to an interpretative centre. Its displays include a history of the town, First nation's fishing techniques, and a collection of marine oddities, such as swordfish eyes, and shark jaws. There is a selection of artifacts on hand, and there are also a number of interactive exhibits for children and adults.

In addition to the interpretive centre, the Crescent Beach Centre is also home to a visitor information centre.
