= 1935 Canadian banknote series =

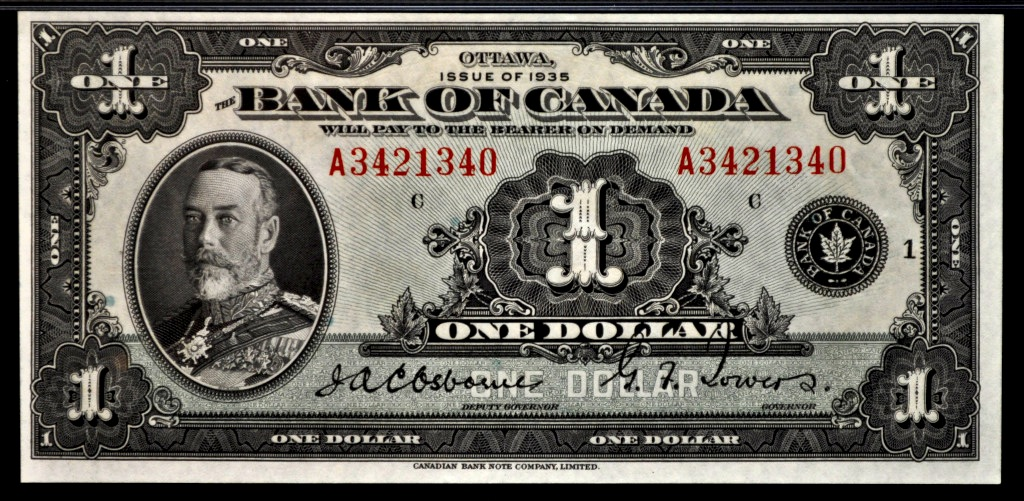
The $1 banknote of the 1935 Series features a portrait of George V.

The 1935 Canadian banknote series is the first series of banknotes of the Canadian dollar issued by the Bank of Canada. They were first circulated on 11 March 1935, the same day that the Bank of Canada officially started operating. Two sets of banknotes were printed for each denomination, one in French for Quebec, and one in English for the rest of Canada. This is the only series issued by the Bank of Canada with dual unilingual banknotes. This series was followed by the 1937 Canadian banknote series.

The Bank of Canada issued a press release in February 1935 announcing details of the banknotes to "prevent possible confusion" amongst the public and as a protective measure against counterfeiting. The Bank of Canada Act which had established the Bank of Canada also resulted in the repeal of the Finance Act and the Dominion Notes Act. With the introduction of the 1935 series into circulation, the series of Dominion of Canada banknotes were withdrawn from circulation by the Bank of Canada from 1935 to 1950, which also replaced the Department of Finance as the nation's exclusive issuer of banknotes.

== Banknotes ==
The Government of Canada intended to release the banknotes on the same day as the official opening of the Bank of Canada. It required months of work and preparation for the design, approval, and production of the banknote series. Designs for the banknotes were created by the Canadian Bank Note Company (CBN) and the British American Bank Note Company (BABN, now BA International), both of which had designed and printed the preceding Dominion of Canada banknotes.

All but the commemorative $25 banknote began circulating on 11 March 1935, the same day that the Bank of Canada officially started operating. All banknotes contained the words "Ottawa, Issue of 1935" centrally at the top of the obverse, except for the $20 banknote, in which the words appeared below the serial number. This is the only Bank of Canada series that includes $25 and $500 banknotes, and the only series that includes the official seal of the Bank of Canada. The $500 banknote was a "carry-over from Dominion of Canada bank notes", and is the only Bank of Canada banknote series to include this denomination.

Other than the language in which they were printed, the English and French banknotes were the same. In May 1935, deputy governor of the Bank of Canada John Osborne wrote a letter to a colleague in England in which he stated that "the English-speaking population is inclined to mutilate the French notes, and the French population complains they cannot get enough of their own notes".

All banknotes in the series measure 152.4 by 73.025 millimetres (6.000 by 2.875 in), slightly shorter and wider than the 1914, 1918, 1928, and 1934 Federal Reserve Notes in circulation in the United States at the time, and were described by The Ottawa Evening Citizen as a "novelty to Canada". They were printed on a material consisting of 75% linen and 25% cotton manufactured by the Howard Smith Paper Mills (now Domtar).

Denomination	Face image (English)	Face image (French)	Back image (English)	Back image (French)	Colour	Face	Back	Printed	Issued
$1					Green	George V	Agriculture allegory	1935	11 March 1935
$2					Blue	Queen Mary	Transportation allegory	1935	11 March 1935
$5					Orange	Edward, Prince of Wales	Electric power allegory	1935	11 March 1935
$10					Dark purple	Princess Mary	Harvest allegory	1935	11 March 1935
$20					Rose	Princess Elizabeth	Testing the grain allegory	1935	11 March 1935
$25					Royal purple	King George V and Queen Mary	Windsor Castle	1935	6 May 1935
$50					Reddish brown	Prince Albert, Duke of York	Modern Inventions allegory	1935	11 March 1935
$100					Dark brown	Prince Henry, Duke of Gloucester	Commerce and industry allegory	1935	11 March 1935
$500					Sepia	John A. Macdonald	Fertility allegory	1935	11 March 1935
$1,000					Olive	Wilfrid Laurier	Security allegory	1935	11 March 1935

The banknotes were printed in greater variation of colour than the Dominion of Canada banknotes that had been previously issued. These were green for the $1 banknote, blue for the $2 banknote, orange for the $5 banknote, dark purple for the $10 banknote, rose for the $20 banknote, reddish brown for the $50 banknote, dark brown for the $100 banknote, sepia for the $500 banknote, and olive for the $1,000 banknote. In April 1935, an article in The St. Maurice Valley Chronicle of Trois-Rivières stated that the appearance of the obverse of the $1 and $2 banknotes were too similar, particularly the green hue of the $1 banknote and the blue hue of the $2 banknote. It stated that the colours of the reverse were more distinct, but could be "confused in artificial light". The same article stated that the similarity between the English and French versions of the banknotes was a positive feature. For the 1937 Series banknotes, the Bank of Canada would change the colour of the $2 banknote to terracotta red to address the issue.

The design of the banknotes was in a similar formal baroque style of the earlier Dominion of Canada banknotes, with wide variation between the denominations in the series. The central numerals on the obverse of each denomination have a distinct background design, each with a portrait to the left. The corner numerals and decoration are also different for each banknote denomination.

=== Portraits ===
The royal portraits used for the engravings were based on older photographs of each member of the royal family, who were said to "appear younger than their years on the new notes". Depicted on the $1 banknote was George V. The portrait and design was approved by Edgar Nelson Rhodes on 10 May 1934.

Queen Mary appeared on the $2 banknote, her portrait based on a photograph by Hay Wrighton that was engraved by Will Ford of the American Bank Note Company (ABN) and master engraver Harry P. Dawson of the BABN. The portrait of Edward, Prince of Wales wearing a colonel's uniform on the $5 banknote was based on a Department of External Affairs photograph taken by British photographer Vandyke and engraved by Dawson. On the $10 banknote was a portrait of Princess Mary based on a photograph by official British royal family photographer Richard Speaight and engraved by Dawson.

Princess Elizabeth at the age of 8 appears on the $20 banknote, the portrait based on a Marcus Adams photograph from 1934 for which an engraving was created by master engraver Edwin Gunn of ABN. The portrait of Prince Albert, Duke of York wearing an admiral's uniform on the $50 banknote was based on a photograph taken by Bertram Park, for which an engraving was made by Robert Savage of ABN. It was subsequently used on six of the banknotes of the 1937 Series. The $100 banknote includes a portrait of Prince Henry, Duke of Gloucester wearing the captain's uniform of the 10th Royal Hussars based on a photograph by Vandyke for which Ford created an engraving.

The portrait of John A. Macdonald wearing a fur-collared coat and engraved by Ford is on the $500 banknote (and was also used on the $100 banknote of the 1937 Series banknotes), and a Gunn engraving of Wilfrid Laurier wearing a Prince Albert coat is the portrait on the $1000 banknote.

=== Allegories ===
Each denomination had a reverse depicting an allegorical figure, the framing of which was different for each denomination. Agriculture was depicted on the $1 banknote based on a painting by Alonzo Foringer of ABN, based on an engraving made by Will Jung. A transportation allegory featuring the Roman mythological figure Mercury created by BABNC artists was on the $2 banknote, electric power generation engraved by Dawson on the $5 banknote, and of harvest engraved by Dawson on the $10 banknote. The $20 bank note, also based on a painting by Alonzo Foringer of ABN, shows two allegorical figures representing toil. An allegory of modern inventions is on the $50 banknote, and commerce and industry is on the $100 banknote. The fertility allegory on the $500 banknote was based on another painting by Foringer. The allegorical figure of security on the $1,000 banknote was previously used on a 1917 issue of Russian bonds.

=== Commemorative $25 banknote ===
On 6 May 1935, the Bank of Canada issued a $25 banknote to commemorate the Silver Jubilee of the accession of George V to the throne. It was a royal purple banknote with the portraits of King George V and Queen Mary on the obverse engraved by Ford and Gunn, and a scene depicting Windsor Castle on the reverse engraved by Louis Delmoce of ABN. It was the first commemorative banknote issued by the Bank of Canada.

== Printing ==
All printings of each denomination of the banknote series were signed by Graham Towers, the Governor of the Bank of Canada, and J.A.C. Osborne, the deputy governor.

Serial numbers were not used for 1935 series banknotes. The red numbers found on the notes consist of one series prefix letter, followed by a seven-digit sheet number. English banknotes used series prefix letter A, and French banknotes used series prefix letter F. For English $1 notes only, once all prefix letter A sheet numbers had been used, a second series was started using prefix letter B.

Four notes were printed on a sheet of paper, and each of the four notes on the sheet were stamped with the same red sheet number. Below the sheet numbers is a single black "check letter" (A, B, C, or D), indicating the note's position on the sheet.

The Canadian Bank Note Company printed the $1, $20, $50, $100, $500, and $1,000 banknotes, and the commemorative $25 banknote. The British American Bank Note Company printed the $2, $5, and $10 banknotes.

== Collecting ==
As of 2009, for a banknote graded as "very fine" a collector could expect to pay about US$1,600 for the commemorative $25 banknote, US$1,150 for the $50 banknote, US$750 for the $20 banknote, US$150 for the $10 banknote, and US$50 for the $1 banknote.

Fewer notes of this series were printed in French than in English. For example, there were approximately 1,000,000 $20 English notes printed, compared to approximately 200,000 French notes.
