= Miriam Waddington =

Canadian poet, short story writer and translator (1917–2004)

- Born: Miriam Dworkin; 23 December 1917; Winnipeg, Manitoba, Canada
- Died: 3 March 2004 (aged 86); Vancouver, British Columbia, Canada
- Writing career
- Pen name: E. B. Merrit
- Notable works: Driving Home: Poems New and Selected

Miriam Waddington (née Dworkin; 23 December 1917 – 3 March 2004) was a Canadian poet, short story writer and translator. She was part of a Montreal literary circle that included F. R. Scott, Irving Layton and Louis Dudek.

== Biography ==
Miriam Waddington was born in Winnipeg, Manitoba, she studied English at the University of Toronto (B.A. 1939) and social work at the University of Pennsylvania (M.A.). She worked for many years as a social worker in Montreal, Quebec. She later relocated to the then Toronto suburb of North York, where she worked for North York Family Services. In 1964, she joined the English department at York University. She retired in 1983.

She died in Vancouver, British Columbia, Canada on 3 March 2004 after suffering a stroke in late February. After her death, much of her own works and personal library were donated by her sons to the archives of Simon Fraser University in Burnaby, British Columbia. Her archival fonds is held at Library and Archives Canada in Ottawa.

== Awards and honours ==
=== Literary awards ===
- 1963, 1966 and 1974: Borestone Mountain Awards for poetry.
- 1973/74: J. I. Segal Award for English fiction and poetry on a Jewish theme, for Driving Home: Poems New and Selected.
- 1986/87: J. I. Segal Award for English fiction and poetry on a Jewish theme, for Collected Poems.

=== Honorary degrees ===
- 1975: Honorary Doctor of Letters from Lakehead University.
- 1985: Honorary Doctor of Letters from York University.

=== Other recognition ===
- 1980: Selected as the Canada Council's exchange poet to Wales.
- 2004: An excerpt from her poem "Jacques Cartier in Toronto" appeared on the back of the Canadian $100 banknote issued on 17 March.

== Works ==
=== Poetry collections ===
- Green World (1945).
- The Second Silence (1955).
- The Season's Lovers (1958).
- The Glass Trumpet (1966).
- Flying with Milton (1969).
- Say Yes (1969).
- Dream Telescope (1972).
- Driving Home: Poems New and Selected (1972).
- The Price of Gold (1976).
- Mister Never (1978).
- The Visitants (1981).
- Collected Poems (1986).
- The Last Landscape (1992).
- Canada: Romancing the Land (1996).
- Four Poems (publication date uncertain).
- Advice to the Young (publication date unknown).

=== Short story collections ===
- Summer at Lonely Beach and Other Stories (1982).

=== Literary criticism and essays ===
- A. M. Klein (1970), a study of the poet A. M. Klein.
- Folklore in the Poetry of A. M. Klein (1981).
- Apartment Seven: Essays New and Selected (1989).

=== Books edited ===
- John Sutherland: Essays, Controversies and Poems (1972), writings by John Sutherland.
- The Collected Poems of A. M. Klein (1974), poems by A. M. Klein.

Bibliographical information is drawn from Brock University's bibliography of Waddington.
