= Paul Jenkins (economist) =

Canadian economist

Senior Deputy Governor of the Bank of Canada
- In office April 1, 2003 – April 1, 2010
- Succeeded by: Tiff Macklem

Personal details
- Born: St. Catharines, Ontario
- Education: B.A. Economics, University of Western Ontario M.Sc. Economics, London School of Economics and Political Science
- Profession: Economist

Paul Jenkins is a Canadian economist and Distinguished Fellow at The Centre for International Governance Innovation. He was most recently the Senior Deputy Governor and Chief Operating Officer of the Bank of Canada, the number two position in that institution.

Born in St. Catharines, Ontario, he graduated from Sir Winston Churchill Secondary School (St. Catharines). Jenkins completed his undergraduate economics education at The University of Western Ontario with an honours bachelor of arts degree in economics. He then attended the London School of Economics and Political Science, where he received a master of science degree in economics in 1972. In 1982–83, he continued studies in economics at Princeton University.

Jenkins joined the Bank of Canada in 1972 as an economist with the Research Department. In 1978, he moved to the Department of Monetary and Financial Analysis and was named Deputy Chief of the Department in 1983. He became Chief of the Research Department in 1984 and was made an Adviser to the Governor in January 1989. He became a Deputy Governor of the Bank in 1992 and held that appointment until becoming Senior Deputy Governor and Chief Operating Officer in 2003. His duties included acting for the Governor, overseeing strategic planning and coordinating all the Bank's operations, sharing responsibility for the conduct of monetary policy as a member of the Bank's Governing Council, and participating in fulfilling the Bank's responsibilities for promoting financial stability.

Jenkins was considered the front-runner to succeed David A. Dodge as Governor but instead was passed over in favour of Mark Carney. Jenkins notified the board on October 29, 2009 that he would not seek a renewal once his seven-year term expired in April 2010.
