= Alonzo Foringer =

American painter

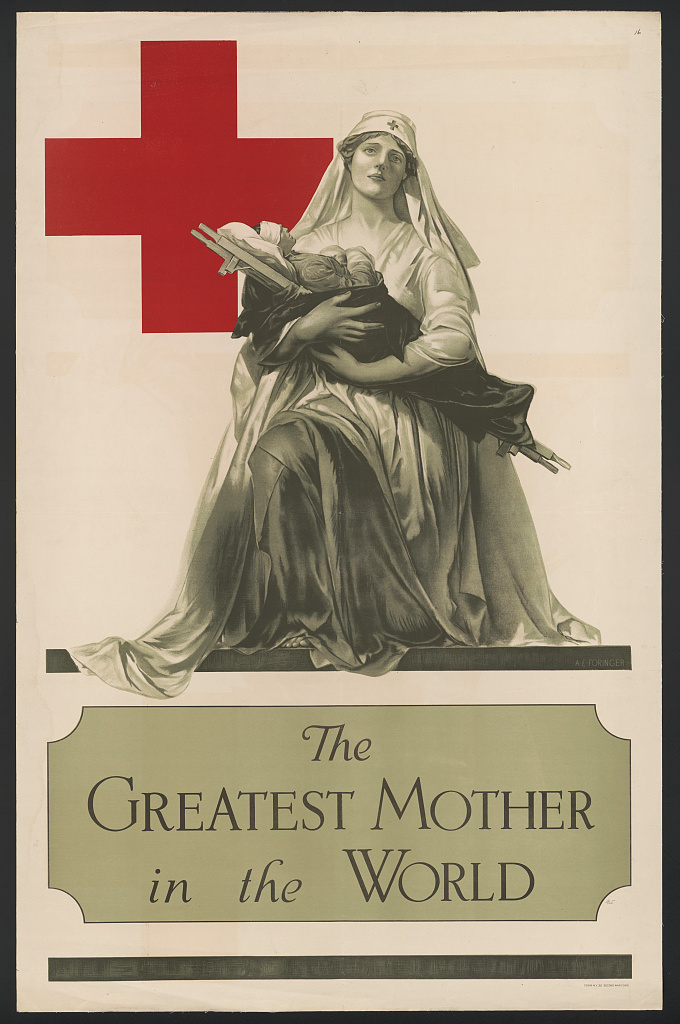
The Greatest Mother in the World, A. E. Foringer's 1917 poster for the Red Cross during World War I

Alonzo Earl Foringer (February 1, 1878 – December 8, 1948) was a painter best known for his World War I Red Cross promotional poster, The Greatest Mother in the World.

== Biography ==
Born in Kaylor, Pennsylvania, Foringer spent the early part of his life in Armstrong County.

Foringer received artistic training from Horatio S. Stevenson in Pittsburgh, then from Henry Siddons Mowbray and Edwin Howland Blashfield in New York City. Later, he moved to Saddle River, New Jersey.

A perpetual bachelor, Foringer's household included his brother, T. Milton, and his sisters, Lilian, Ire, and Edith. The Foringer name was important in local politics between Alonzo's art career and Milton's 31-year career on the Saddle River borough council.

He died December 8, 1948, in Saddle River, following an illness.

Foringer's former home in Saddle River is now a historic landmark, listed on the National Register of Historic Places.

== Career ==
- Foringer completed 11 murals for the Council Chambers of the Yonkers City Hall.
- Around 1911, Foringer completed a mural for the Mercer County, Pennsylvania, courthouse depicting Justice hearing a case before the public in the building's Courtroom 2.
- Foringer completed a promotional poster for the Red Cross during World War I known as The Greatest Mother in the World, and which depicts a nurse cradling an undersized soldier on a stretcher similar to popular imagery of Mary holding the Christ child.
