= Bank of Canada Act =

Act of the Parliament of Canada

Parliament of Canada
- Long title: An Act respecting the Bank of Canada
- Citation: SC 1934 (24 & 25 Geo V), c 43; RSC 1985, c B-2
- Enacted by: House of Commons of Canada
- Enacted: June 30, 1934
- Enacted by: Senate of Canada
- Assented to: July 3, 1934
- Commenced: March 1935

Legislative history

Initiating chamber: House of Commons of Canada
- Bill title: 19
- Introduced by: Edgar Nelson Rhodes
- First reading: February 22, 1934
- Second reading: March 8-9, 1934
- Third reading: June 27-28, 1934

Revising chamber: Senate of Canada
- Bill title: 19
- Member(s) in charge: Arthur Meighen
- First reading: June 28, 1934
- Second reading: same as above
- Third reading: June 30, 1934

The Bank of Canada Act (French: Loi sur la Banque du Canada) is a statute that sets out the governance structure and powers of the Bank of Canada, which was created in 1934 as Canada's central bank. It was created as the result of the 1933 Royal Commission on Banking and Currency.

== Synopsis ==
Prior to 1934, Canada had no central bank and fragmented control of the banking system. The Canadian Bankers Association, founded in 1891, held some administrative roles within the bank system, and the Bank of Montreal had been the government's banker since 1817. In The Bank of Canada Act, 1934, The Bank of Canada was incorporated by the 17th Canadian Parliament under the Bennett administration as a central bank "to regulate credit and currency in the best interests of the economic life of the nation ... and generally to promote the economic and financial welfare of the Dominion." The initial capital was CA$5 million, consisting of shares of fifty dollars each for public subscription.

Under Section 24, it was given the sole right to issue notes payable to the bearer on demand and issue notes to any amount. Under Section 25, these notes (known as legal tender) could be converted to gold at the head office in Ottawa, in the form of bars containing approximately four hundred ounces of gold. The bank continues in the current Act to be the sole institution to issue notes. The bank must provide an adequate supply as required for circulation in Canada. The Act requires all banknotes of the Canadian dollar to be approved by the Minister of Finance for "form and material".

The bank had to maintain a reserve as security against its outstanding notes and deposit liabilities. This was an amount of gold coin and bullion comprising 25% of the notes and deposit liabilities, silver bullion and foreign exchange. The bank also held the Government of Canada's supply of gold and silver and Government of Canada securities. The bank was required to provide to the Minister of Finance each Wednesday a statement of assets and liabilities, which was published the following week in the Canada Gazette.

The bank became a special federal Crown corporation in 1938 during the time of WLM King's 3rd term as Prime Minister. Amendments to the Act allowed the Bank of Canada to divide the capital of the bank into one hundred thousand shares of a value of fifty dollars each, which were issued to the Minister of Finance to be held on behalf of Her Majesty in right of Canada. This provision remains in the current Bank of Canada Act, which has been amended numerous times. The Act provides for the provision of increases in its capital as directed by the Minister.

Under the act, the bank is governed by a board of directors composed of a governor, deputy governor and twelve (originally seven) directors, including the deputy minister of finance. The management of the bank is done by the governor, who is the chief executive officer, plus the deputy governor and assistant deputy governors. They are appointed for terms of seven years, at salaries determined by the directors of the bank. Directors of the bank are to be determined from various occupations, but candidates must be Canadian citizens (originally as written in 1934, British subjects) and not employed by other financial institutions or a shareholder in other financial institutions (originally this was chartered bank directorship, ownership or employment) and other requirements under the Act. Under section 18(j) of the modern Act the bank's powers include to "make loans to the Government of Canada or the government of any province, but such loans outstanding at any one time shall not, in the case of the Government of Canada, exceed one-third of the estimated revenue of the Government of Canada for its fiscal year, and shall not, in the case of a provincial government, exceed one-fourth of that government’s estimated revenue for its fiscal year, and such loans shall be repaid before the end of the first quarter after the end of the fiscal year of the government that has contracted the loan."

=== Quantitative easing ===
Quantitative easing is a novel form of monetary policy that came into wide application following the 2008 financial crisis. In a 2015 publication of the Library of Parliament, Becklumb and Frigon reviewed this practice as it applied to the Bank of Canada and its governing legislation. Stuckey updated this research publication in 2021 to write that:

The creation of money by the Bank of Canada through the purchase of assets like Government of Canada securities has fundamentally the same financial impact as the Bank making loans to the federal government, yet the Bank’s governing law, the Bank of Canada Act, does not explicitly empower it to make loans of this nature. Rather, this Act gives the Bank the power to “buy and sell securities issued or guaranteed by Canada or any province” (section 18(c)), as well as the power to “accept deposits from the Government of Canada and pay interest on those deposits” (section 18(l)). Taken together, these two provisions appear to empower the Bank to create money through the direct purchase of Government of Canada securities at debt auctions.

In a 2022 paper for the CD Howe Institute entitled "The Consequences of the Bank of Canada’s Ballooned Balance Sheet", Ambler Koeppl and Kronick wrote that:

The Bank of Canada’s balance sheet has undergone a radical transformation since the beginning of the pandemic. The Bank’s total assets more than quadrupled at their peak and still remain 3.5 times higher.. We therefore suggest amending the Bank of Canada Act in order to allow the Bank of Canada to create a deferred asset to cover the operational losses. That way the Bank formally has no negative equity arising from operational losses and must use future profits to pay down the entire deferred asset before remitting profits to the government, thereby compensating for current losses. This will enable the Bank to credibly communicate its current strategy of quantitative tightening, in particular making clear that it is in line with its aggressive tightening of the overnight rate to achieve the 2 percent inflation target in the near future.. our preferred [option] is to follow the practice of the US Federal Reserve, which books operational losses as deferred assets on its balance sheet. This deferred asset is paid off from future profits before returning any surpluses to the Treasury. While such an arrangement would require a change to the Bank of Canada Act, it would be transparent enough for the Bank to convey to the public, signaling its continuing independence.. This requires changes to the Bank of Canada Act but will provide increased clarity and transparency for the Bank.

== See also ==
- Federal Reserve Act
- Bank of England Act 1716
- Canada Deposit Insurance Corporation
