= Governor of the Bank of Canada =

Leader of Canada's central bank

- Gouverneur de la Banque du Canada
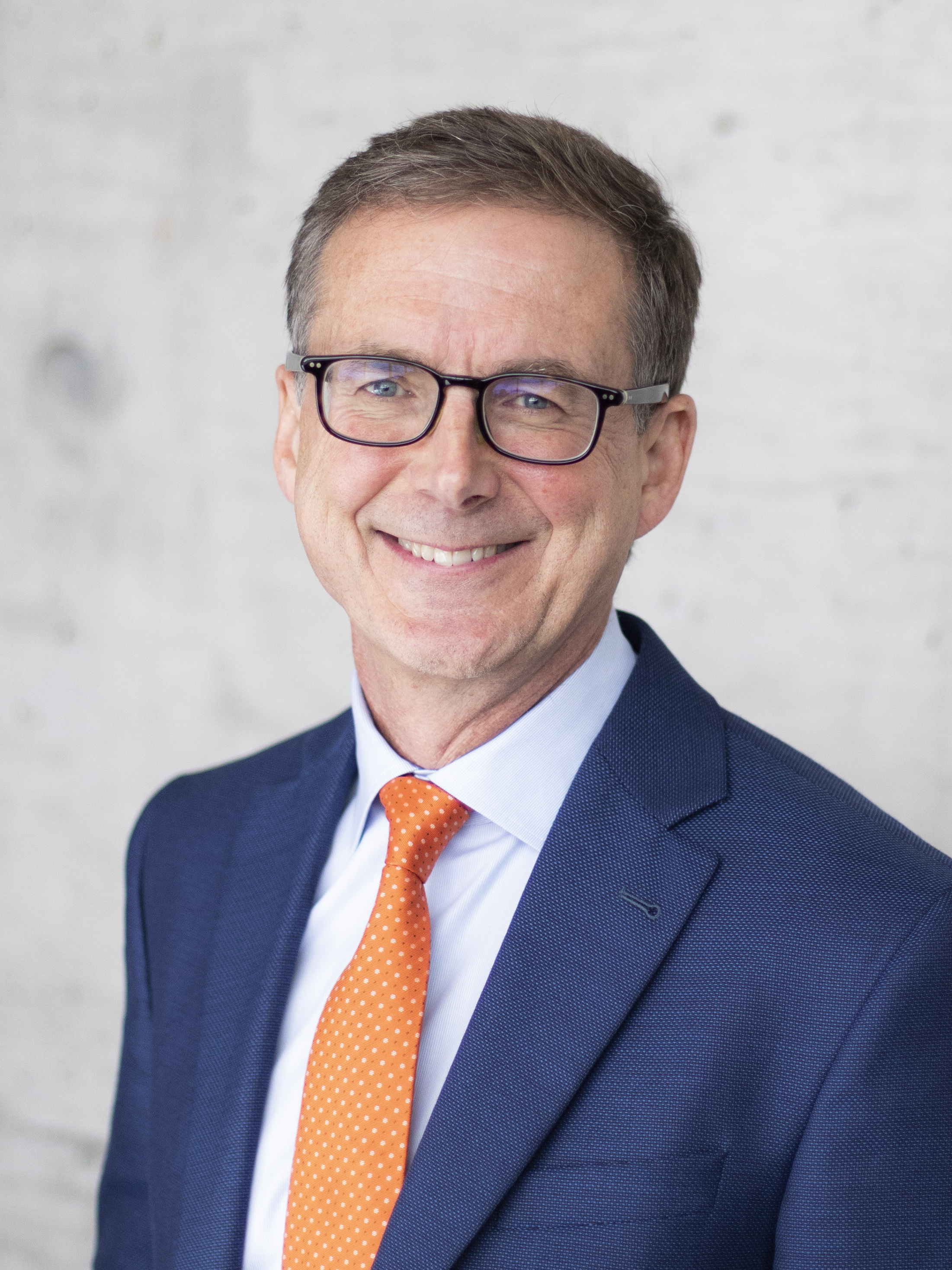
- Incumbent; Tiff Macklem since June 3, 2020
- Bank of Canada
- Reports to: Minister of Finance
- Seat: Ottawa, Ontario
- Appointer: Board of Directors; with Governor in Council approval
- Term length: Seven years, renewable
- Constituting instrument: Bank of Canada Act
- Formation: 1934
- First holder: Graham Towers
- Deputy: Senior Deputy Governor
- Website: bank-banque-canada.ca

The governor of the Bank of Canada (French: gouverneur de la Banque du Canada) is the chief executive officer of the Bank of Canada and acts as chair of its board of directors. The Bank of Canada Act, 1985, S. 6(1), provides that the governor and deputy governor shall be appointed by the directors with the approval of the Governor-General-in-Council.

Tiff Macklem serves as the current governor. He assumed office on June 3, 2020.

== Roles and responsibilities ==
The governor and deputy governor sign each series of Canadian banknotes and the governor is the ex-officio alternate voter on the International Monetary Fund.

== Lists ==
Governors
| No. | Name | Term |
|---|---|---|
| 1 | Graham Towers | 1934–1954 |
| 2 | James Coyne | 1955–1961 |
| 3 | Louis Rasminsky | 1961–1973 |
| 4 | Gerald Bouey | 1973–1987 |
| 5 | John Crow | 1987–1994 |
| 6 | Gordon Thiessen | 1994–2001 |
| 7 | David A. Dodge | 2001–2008 |
| 8 | Mark Carney | 2008–2013 |
| 9 | Stephen Poloz | 2013–2020 |
| 10 | Tiff Macklem | 2020–present |

Senior deputy governors
| No. | Name | Term |
|---|---|---|
| 1 | John Robert Beattie | 1970–1971 |
| 2 | Gerald Bouey | 1972–1973 |
| 3 | R. William Lawson | 1973–1984 |
| 4 | John Crow | 1984–1987 |
| 5 | Gordon Thiessen | 1987–1994 |
| 6 | Bernard Bonin | 1994–1999 |
| 7 | Malcolm Knight | 1999–2003 |
| 8 | Paul Jenkins | 2003–2010 |
| 9 | Tiff Macklem | 2010–2014 |
| 10 | Carolyn Wilkins | 2014–2020 |
| 11* | Carolyn Rogers | 2021–present |

The position of Senior Deputy Governor was created in 1970, with its responsibilities previously divested in one or more deputy governors.

Deputy Governor Timothy Lane assumed such duties as providing the Deputy Governor's signature for banknotes between the resignation of Carolyn Wilkins and the naming of Carolyn Rogers as Senior Deputy Governor.

== See also ==
- Crown corporation
- Governor of the Bank of England (UK)
- Chairman of the Federal Reserve (US)
