= Currency in circulation =

Value of banknotes and coins still issued

In monetary economics, the currency in circulation in a country is the value of currency or cash (banknotes and coins) that has ever been issued by the country’s monetary authority less the amount that has been removed. More broadly, money in circulation is the total money supply of a country, which can be defined in various ways, but always includes currency and also some types of bank deposits, such as deposits at call.

The published amount of currency in circulation tends to be overstated by an unknown amount. For example, money may have been destroyed, or stored as a form of security (the proverbial “money under the mattress”), or by coin collectors, or held in reserve within the banking system, including currency held by foreign central banks as a foreign exchange reserve asset.

== Domestic demand for currency ==
The currency in circulation in a country is based on the need or demand for cash in the community. The monetary authority of each country (or currency zone) is responsible for ensuring there is enough money in circulation to meet the commercial needs of the economy, and releases additional notes and coins when there is a demand for them.

Banks would routinely or exceptionally order cash from the monetary authority to meet anticipated demand, and keep it in reserve in the bank. The banking regulator would typically determine the banks’ reserve requirements, including the minimum proportion of a bank’s assets that banks must hold in cash. When banks no longer believe they need as much cash in reserve they would return the cash to the monetary authority. Subject to directives from the regulator, banks tend to keep their cash reserves as low as is prudently necessary, as banks do not earn interest on it, and incur a cost to keep it securely. (The amount taken out of reserve is available for lending, at interest.) The amount of money needed to be at call varies because of a number of factors. For example, in many countries there is a higher demand at Christmas time when commercial activity is highest. Also, when workers were paid in cash, there was a higher demand for pay-day. There may also be sudden, unexpected surges in demand for cash by individuals during economic panics, which may result in a "run on the bank" as individuals seek to withdraw money from bank accounts. Cash held by banks is counted as part of the currency in circulation.

Cash that is in the hands of individuals and businesses in the community may be needed for routine or exceptional purchases or held in reserve. Nowadays, a large part of everyday transactions is effected using electronic funds transfers, without the use of cash. When a business makes a cash sale, it will keep the cash it receives until it pays it to someone else or deposits it into a bank account, keeping part of it in its "float", in order to give change to customers. A significant part of the cash in circulation is used by and held within the black economy.

== Foreign currency reserves ==
Central banks of many countries hold currency of another country in their foreign exchange reserves, which can include banknotes, deposits, bonds, treasury bills and other government securities. The cash component is counted by the issuing central bank as part of its currency in circulation.

== Total currency in circulation ==
In 1990, total currency in circulation in the world passed the equivalent of one trillion United States dollars. After 12 years, in 2002 this figure was two trillion USD, and in 2008 it had increased to four trillion USD. (These figures do not make allowance for inflation or population changes.)

The Bank for International Settlements provides detailed statistics of the worth of banknotes and coins for 18 major currencies used by the member states of the Committee on Payments and Market Infrastructures (CPMI). The table below shows the statistics as of 31 December 2016 in billions of US dollars using the exchange rate at the end of the year. The total value is $4,687 billion.

Value of banknotes and coin in circulation (31 December 2016)
Country or region	Billions of US dollars	US$ per capita
Switzerland	79.68	9,516.04
Hong Kong SAR	54.16	7,341.34
Japan	915.72	7,214.21
Singapore	29.39	5,241.81
United States	1,509.34	4,671.03
Euro area	1,217.91	3,579.10
Australia	57.71	2,379.05
Canada	64.40	1,787.01
Saudi Arabia	53.33	1,677.72
South Korea	80.48	1,584.11
United Kingdom	93.78	1,428.55
Russia	145.11	989.34
Sweden	6.88	688.80
Mexico	68.71	565.17
Turkey	35.40	443.58
Brazil	71.23	345.64
India	196.49	151.26
South Africa	7.20	130.90
CPMI Total	4,686.91	1,598.16

== See also ==
- Business strike - coins intended for circulation (as opposed to commemorative and bullion coins)
- Coining
- Counterfeit money
- History of money
- List of circulating currencies
- Velocity of money
