= Canadian Bank Note Company =

Canadian company that supplies bank notes

Canadian Bank Note Company, Limited
- Industry: Printing
- Founded: 1897
- Headquarters: Ottawa, Ontario, Canada
- Key people: Douglas R. Arends, Chair; Marilou Arends, CEO
- Products: Banknotes; identity documents; lottery tickets; postage stamps
- Website: www.cbnco.com

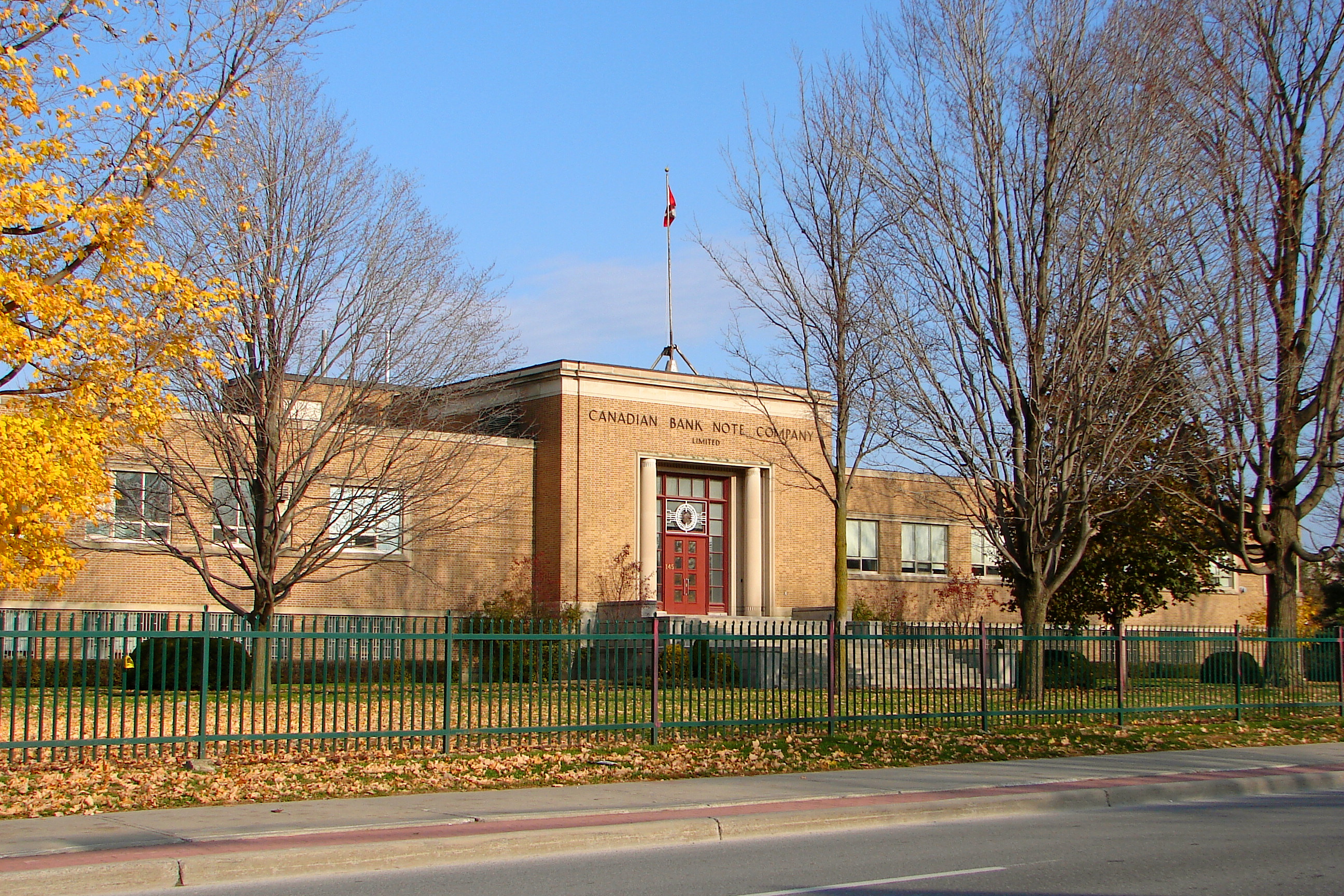
CBN head office in Westboro, Ottawa

The Canadian Bank Note Company (CBNC) is a Canadian security printing company. It is best known for holding the contract with the Bank of Canada to supply it with Canada's banknotes since 1935. The company's other clients include private businesses, national and sub-national governments, central banks, and postal services from around the world. In addition to banknotes, the company produces passports, driver's licences, birth certificates, postage stamps, coupons, and many other security-conscious document-related products. It also prints and provides document reading systems for identification cards, lottery tickets, stamps, and banknotes.

From 1897 until 1923, CBN was a unit of the New York–based American Bank Note Company (now known as ABCorp). It was later a privately held company when it was acquired by Ottawa businessman Charles Worthen; beginning in 1976 Douglas Arends slowly acquired control of the company. It has since been based in Ottawa, Ontario.

Since 2014, the Canadian Bank Note Company has been the chief provider for machine-readable passports used within the Caribbean Community bloc of countries. The majority of the new CARICOM passports as they are called serve the union as a centrepiece of promoting easy travel within the Caribbean Single Market and Economy (CSME).

== Gallery ==
Samples of items printed by Canadian Bank Note Company:

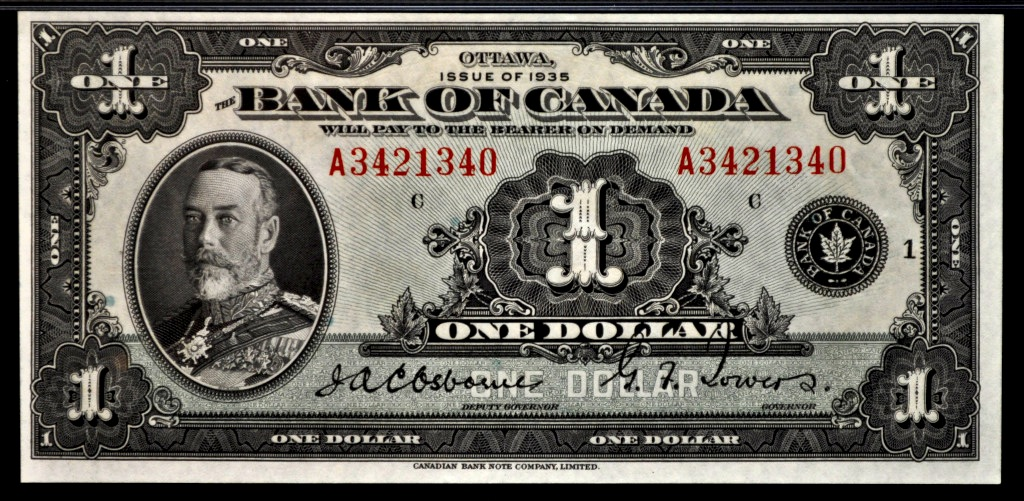
Bank of Canada $1 note, 1935

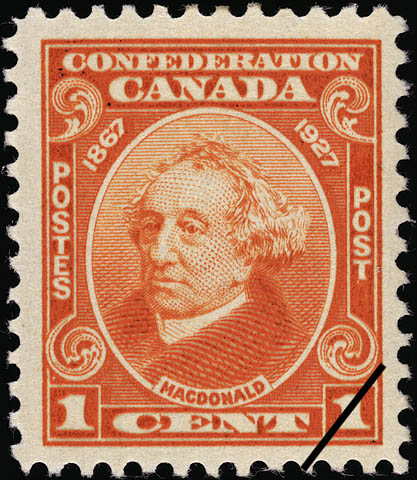
Canada 1 cent MacDonald 1927

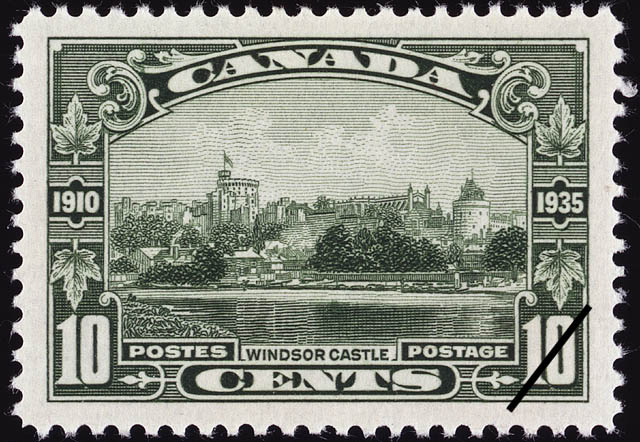
Canada 10 cents Windsor Castle 1935

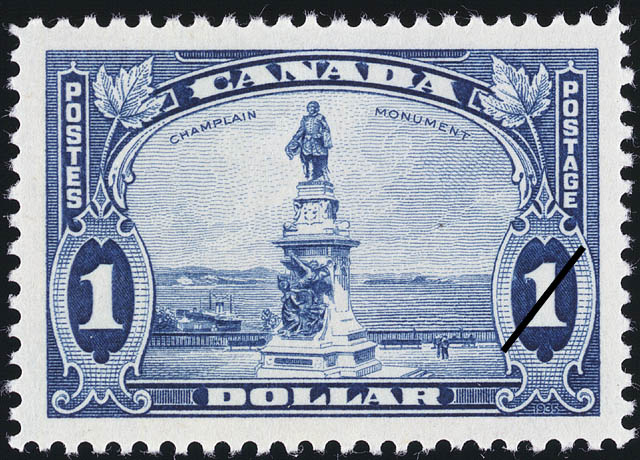
Canada dollar Champlain 1935

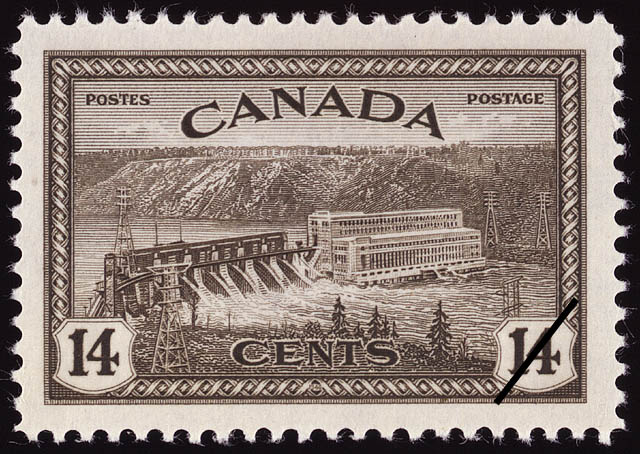
Canada Hydroelectrique 1946

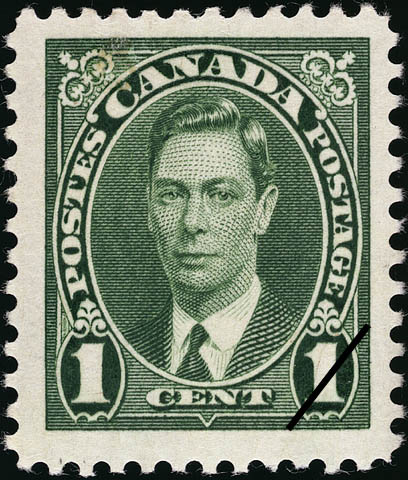
Canada George VI 1937

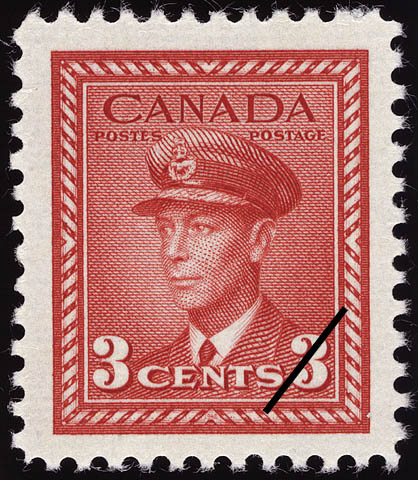
Canada George VI 1942

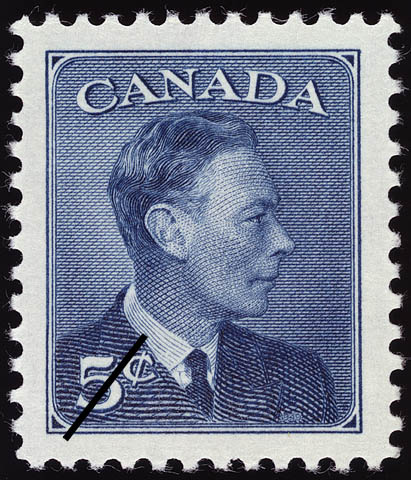
Canada George VI 1950

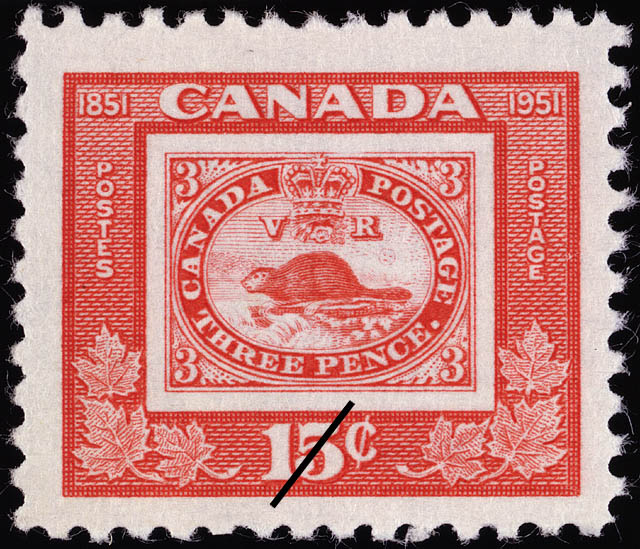
Canada Castor 1951

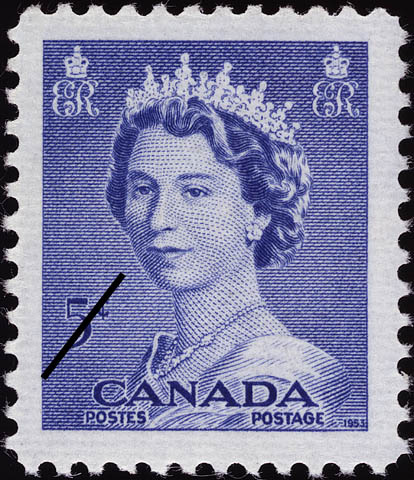
Canada 5 cents Elizabeth II Karsh

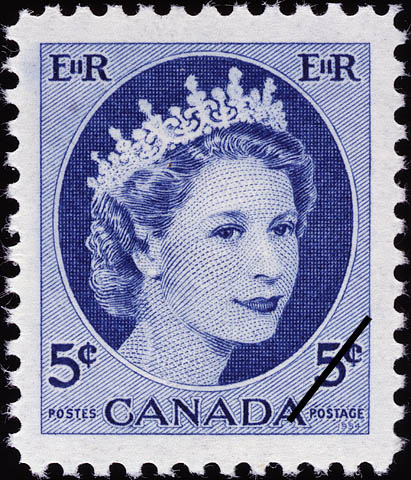
Canada 5 cents Elizabeth II Wilding

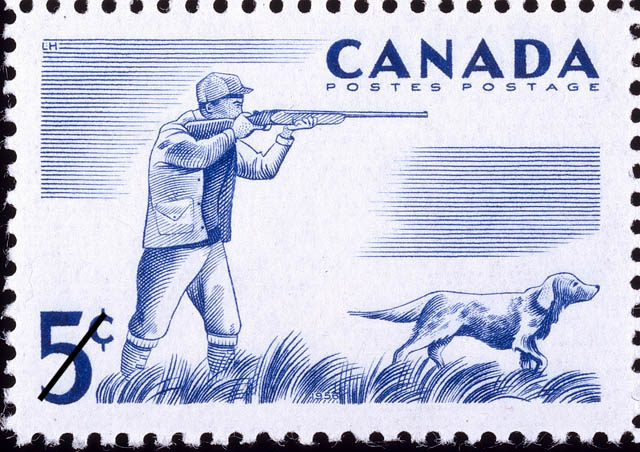
Canada 5 cents Chasse 1957

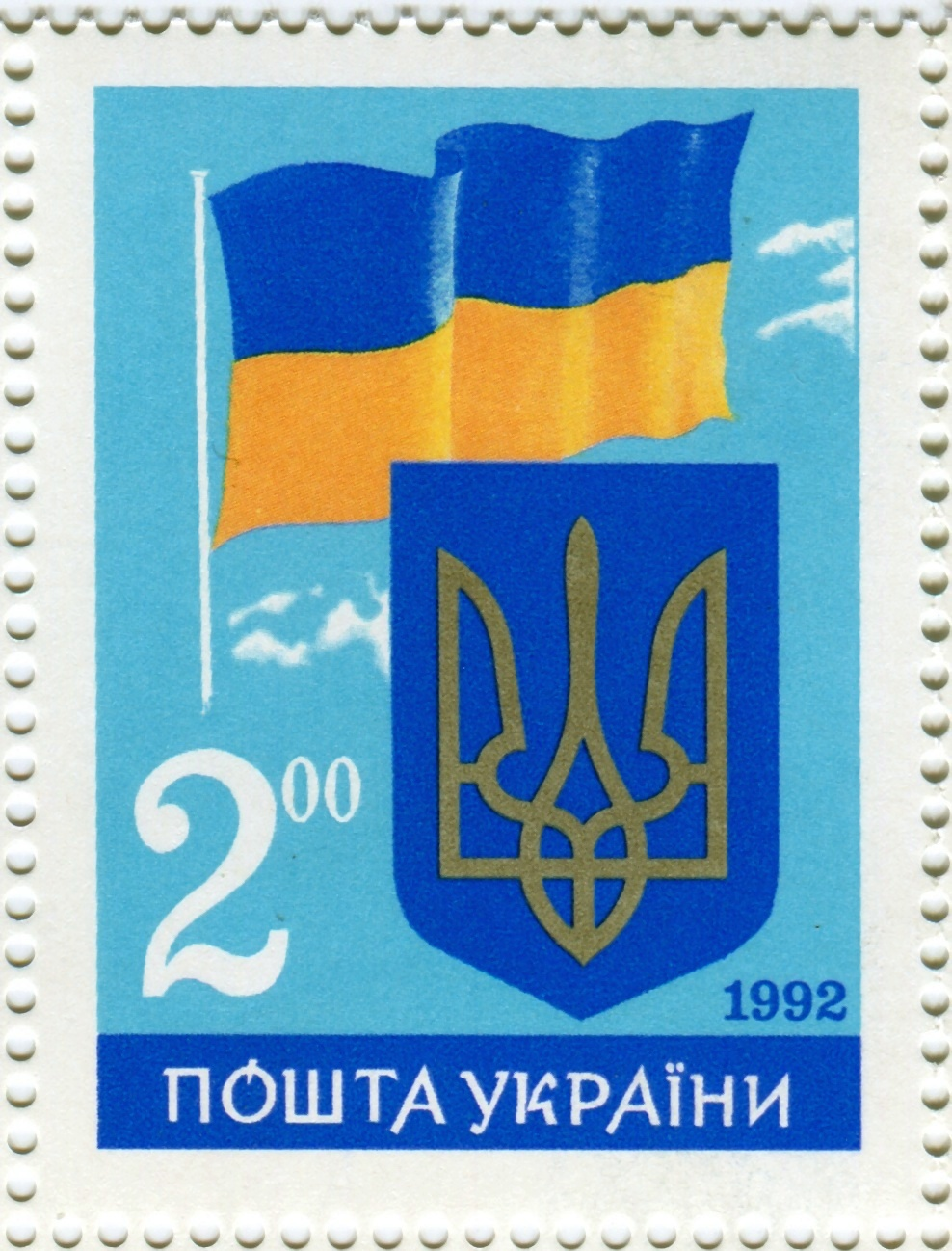
Ukrainian 2 karbovanets First year of Independence

== See also ==
- Canadian dollar
- Cash
- Bank of Canada
- Royal Canadian Mint
