= Banknotes of the Canadian dollar =

Obverse of the 2011 Frontier series depicting portraits of Wilfrid Laurier ($5), John A. Macdonald ($10), Queen Elizabeth II ($20), William Lyon Mackenzie King ($50), and Robert Borden ($100)

Banknotes of the Canadian dollar are the banknotes or bills (in common lexicon) of Canada, denominated in Canadian dollars (CAD, C$, or $ locally). Currently, they are issued in $5, $10, $20, $50, and $100 denominations. All current notes are issued by the Bank of Canada, which released its first series of notes in 1935. The Bank of Canada has contracted the Canadian Bank Note Company to produce the Canadian notes since then. The current series of polymer banknotes were introduced into circulation between November 2011 and November 2013. Banknotes issued in Canada can be viewed at the Bank of Canada Museum in Ottawa.

== Currently produced series ==
The currently produced banknote series of the Canadian dollar both consist of polymer banknotes: the 7th series (Frontier), which was launched in 2011, and the 8th series (Vertical), which was launched in 2018.

Value	Main colour	Obverse portrait	Reverse design	Series year	Issued
8th (Vertical) banknote series
$10	Purple	Viola Desmond	Canadian Museum for Human Rights	2018	19 November 2018
7th (Frontier) banknote series
$5	Blue	Wilfrid Laurier	Canadarm2 and Dextre	2013	7 November 2013
$10	Purple	John A. Macdonald	The Canadian passenger train	2013	7 November 2013
$20	Green	Queen Elizabeth II	Canadian National Vimy Memorial and poppies	2012	7 November 2012
$50	Red	William Lyon Mackenzie King	CCGS Amundsen in arctic waters, a map of Canada's North, and the word arctic in Inuktitut (ᐅᑭᐅᖅᑕᖅᑐᖅ, ukiuqtaqtuq)	2012	26 March 2012
$100	Brown	Robert Borden	Medical research, invention of the pacemaker, a DNA double helix, and a vial of insulin	2011	14 November 2011

On 6 May 2023, Prime Minister Justin Trudeau announced that the $20 bill would be updated to feature the new king, Charles III. On December 16, 2024, it was announced that Terry Fox would be featured on the next edition of the $5 banknote, and that Wilfrid Laurier would instead be featured on the next $50 note. On 3 September 2026, the Bank of Canada revealed the new design of the vertical $20 banknote.

== Production ==
Notes are issued by the Bank of Canada, but the actual production of the banknotes is outsourced to the Canadian Bank Note Company in accordance with the specifications and requirements of the Bank of Canada. All wording on the notes appears in both of Canada's official languages, English and French. Banknotes were printed on paper composed of pure cotton. Cotton fibre was discontinued and replaced by a synthetic polymer starting in 2011, with the last of the paper banknotes being made available in November 2013.

== Counterfeiting ==
Efforts to reduce counterfeiting in recent years have sharply reduced the number of counterfeit notes in circulation. The number of counterfeit notes passed annually in Canada peaked in 2004, when 553,000 counterfeit notes were passed. Counterfeiting has decreased annually since that peak, with only 53,536 notes passed in 2010. The new Frontier series of banknotes significantly improves security primarily by using a polymer substrate to make up the note instead of the previously used fabric. Even as Canada's counterfeiting problem escalated, the shift to polymer was viewed as too expensive. A polymer note costs 19 cents to produce, compared to 9 cents for a typical cotton-paper note. All older cotton-paper banknotes prior to the 2013 polymer series are now considered unfit for circulation due to their lack of modern security features, such as a metallic stripe. Financial institutions must return the banknotes to the Bank of Canada, which will destroy them. Individuals may keep the banknotes indefinitely.

Counterfeiting is measured using a system borrowed from chemistry known as parts per million (PPM). Normally used to judge the potency of molecules in a solution, PPM in the counterfeiting sense refers to the number of fake banknotes found in circulation for every one million genuine notes. In 1990, Canada's counterfeit ratio was just 4 PPM, ranking its currency among the most secure in the world. By the late 1990s, the rise of powerful and affordable home computers, store-bought graphics software, easy-to-use scanners and colour ink-jet printers were breeding a new generation of counterfeiters. The number of fake Canadian notes rose as high as 117 PPM by 1997. In 2004 Canada's counterfeiting rate had ballooned to 470 PPM. In 2012, the counterfeiting rate had fallen to its lowest point, at 28 PPM. It has since started modestly rising to 36 PPM in 2014. The Bank of Canada's medium-term planning target is to stay below 30 PPM. Most G20 nations used 50 PPM as their benchmark to stay below.

== History ==
The first paper money in Canada was issued by the colonial government of New France from 1685 to the British conquest. The colonial authorities used playing cards as the basis for the notes, denominated in French currencies. The first paper money in Canada denominated in dollars were British Army notes, issued between 1813 and 1815 in denominations between $1 and $400. These were emergency issues due to the War of 1812. The first banknotes were issued in 1817 by the Montreal Bank.

=== Chartered banks ===
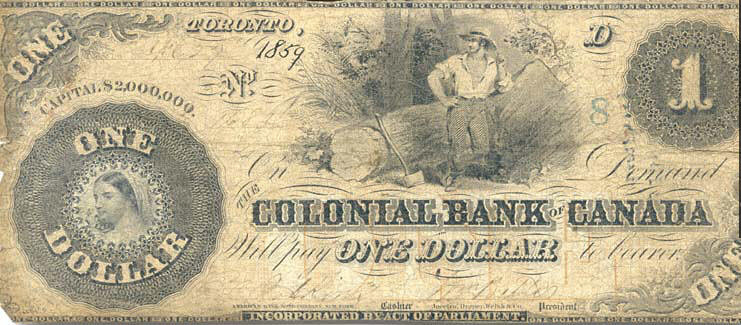
$1 banknote of the Colonial Bank of Canada issued in 1859

Large numbers of chartered banks were founded in the 1830s, 1850s, 1860s and 1870s, although many issued paper money for only a short time. Others, including the Montreal Bank (later called the Bank of Montreal), issued notes for several decades. Until 1858, many notes were issued denominated in both shillings/pounds and dollars (5 shillings = $1 therefore 1 pound = $4). A large number of different denominations were issued, including $1, $2, $3, $4, $5, $10, $20, $25, $40, $50, $100, $500, $750 and $1,000. After 1858, only dollar denominations were used. The Bank Act of 1871 limited the smallest denomination the chartered banks could issue to $4, increased to $5 in 1880. To facilitate purchases below $5 without using Dominion notes, some charted banks issued notes in unusually domesticated denominations, such as the $6 and $7 notes issued by the Molsons Bank in 1871. After Confederation, chartered banks were permitted to continue issuing notes until 1944.

=== Colonial governments ===
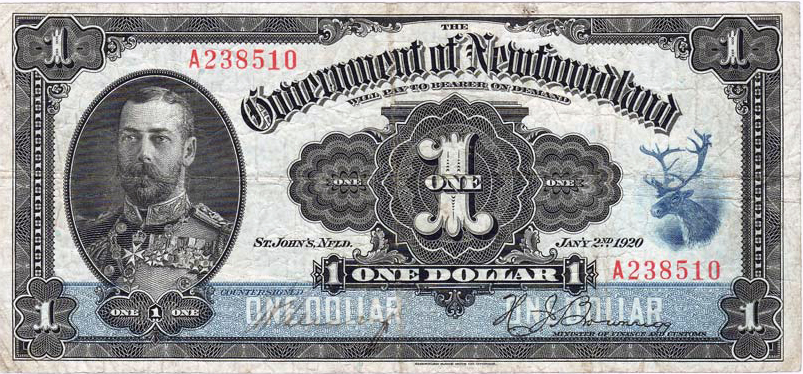
$1 Dominion of Newfoundland note issued in 1920

Before Canadian Confederation, dollar-denominated notes were issued by the governments of the Colony of British Columbia, the Province of Canada, Nova Scotia, and Prince Edward Island. Of these, the Province of Canada, established in 1841, was the most prolific issuer of paper money. Notes were produced for the government by the Bank of Montreal between 1842 and 1862, in denominations of $4, $5, $10, $20, $50 and $100. In 1866, the Province of Canada began issuing its own paper money, in denominations of $1, $2, $5, $10, $20, $50, $100 and $500. The Dominion of Newfoundland issued notes denominated in Newfoundland dollars from 1901 until it joined Confederation in 1949.

=== Government of Canada ===
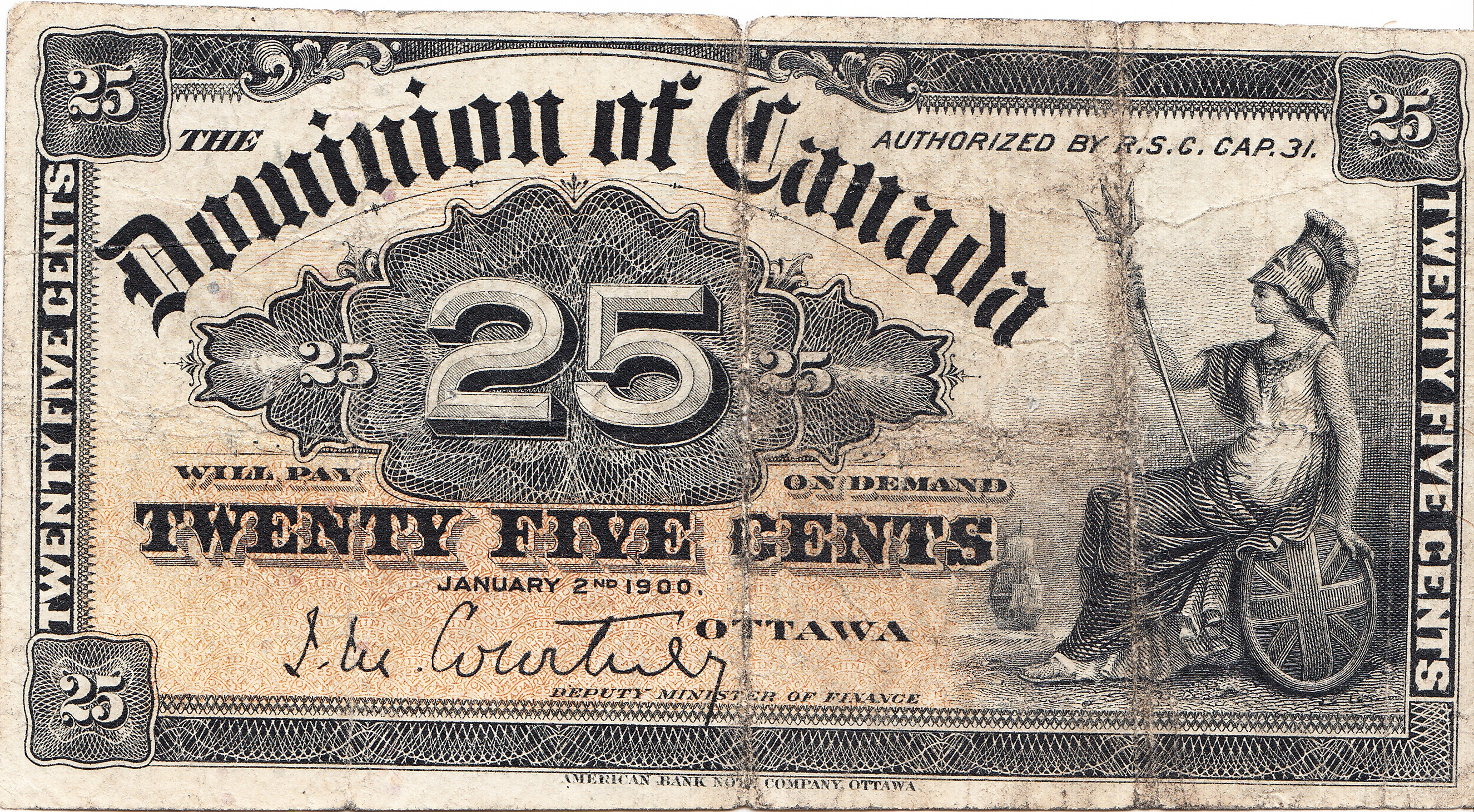
25-cent Dominion of Canada note issued in 1900

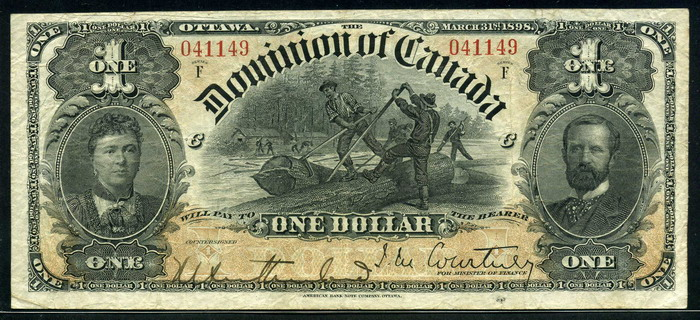
$1 Dominion of Canada note issued in 1898

For a temporary period following Confederation in 1867, Province of Canada notes served as the Dominion of Canada's first national currency, and notes were dispatched from Ontario and Quebec to the other provinces. In 1870, the first Dominion of Canada notes were issued in denominations of 25¢, $1, $2, $500 and $1,000. $50 and $100 notes followed in 1872. The bulk of later government note production was of $1 and $2 notes, with a $4 denomination added in 1882. Notes of $5 were issued starting in 1912. The last 25¢ notes, known as shinplasters due to their small size, were dated 1923. Special notes called Bank Legals were issued by the Dominion of Canada only to banks for transferring large sums of money in denominations of $500, $1,000, $5,000, and $50,000. Issuance of all Dominion notes ceased in 1935, after the establishment of the Bank of Canada.

=== Other public issuers ===
Some municipalities also issued dollar-denominated notes. This was most prevalent in the 1930s, when depression scrip was issued in an attempt to alleviate the effects of the Great Depression on local citizens. The province of Alberta also launched its own scheme in 1936 by issuing prosperity certificates.

=== Bank of Canada ===
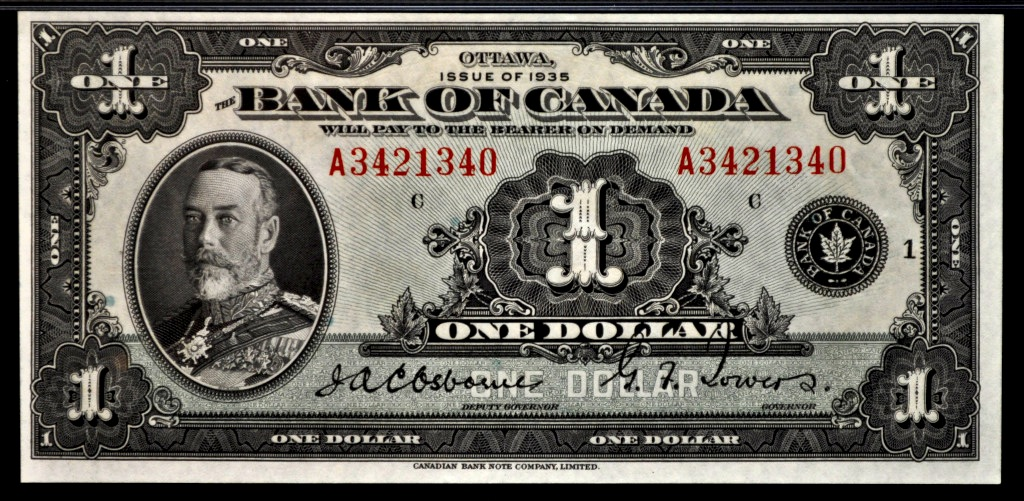
$1 Bank of Canada note issued in 1935

In 1934, with only ten chartered banks still issuing notes, the Bank of Canada was founded and began issuing notes in denominations of $1, $2, $5, $10, $20, $25, $50, $100, $500 and $1000. In 1944, the chartered banks were prohibited from issuing their own currency, with the Royal Bank of Canada and the Bank of Montreal among the last to issue notes. Since then, the Bank of Canada has been the sole issuer of banknotes denominated in Canadian dollars. A liability of more than $12 million remains on the Bank of Canada's books up to the present day, representing the face value of Dominion of Canada, provincial, and chartered bank notes still outstanding.

=== Withdrawn denominations ===
The 1935 series was the only series to have included $25 and $500 denominations. Both denominations were short lived. The $25 note was withdrawn on 18 May 1937. Stacks of unissued 1935 $500 notes were destroyed in February 1938, and issued $500 notes were recalled and withdrawn from circulation five months later.

Some of the most significant recent developments in Canadian currency were the withdrawal of the $1, $2, and $1,000 notes in 1989, 1996, and 2000 respectively. The $1 and $2 denominations have been replaced with coins, colloquially referred to as the "loonie" and "toonie" respectively, with the loonie simultaneously replacing the $1 bill as well as the preceding Voyageur dollar coin, the latter of which remains legal tender. In 2000, the $1,000 note was removed at the request of the Solicitor General of Canada and the Royal Canadian Mounted Police, as it was reported that they were largely being used for money laundering and organized crime.

== List of Bank of Canada banknote series ==
=== 1935 ===
The Bank of Canada was created in 1934 and given responsibility, through an Act of Parliament, to regulate the country's money supply and to "promote the economic and financial welfare of Canada." Accordingly, it was given the exclusive right to issue bank notes in Canada. On 11 March 1935, the Bank of Canada issued its first series of bank notes.

=== 1937 ===
The creation of a second series of bank notes, only two years after the first issue, was prompted by changes in Canadian government legislation requiring the Bank of Canada to produce bilingual bank notes. Another contributing factor was the death of King George V on 20 January 1936, and the subsequent abdication of Edward VIII.

=== 1954 Canadian Landscape ===
The third series of banknotes of the Canadian dollar issued by the Bank of Canada was the Canadian Landscape series. The banknotes were designed in 1952 following the accession of Elizabeth II to the throne after the death of her father George VI. Her portrait appeared on all denominations in the series. The banknote designs differed significantly from the 1937 series, though the denomination colours and bilingual printing were retained. The design changes were made to portray themes more typical of Canada. This was the first series to include the Canadian coat of arms, which appeared centrally in the background of the obverse.

The banknote series became known as the "Devil's Head" series, because the hair behind the Queen's head looked somewhat like a grinning demon. This led to design modifications for all denominations. The second variant of the series was issued in 1956.

=== 1969 Scenes of Canada ===
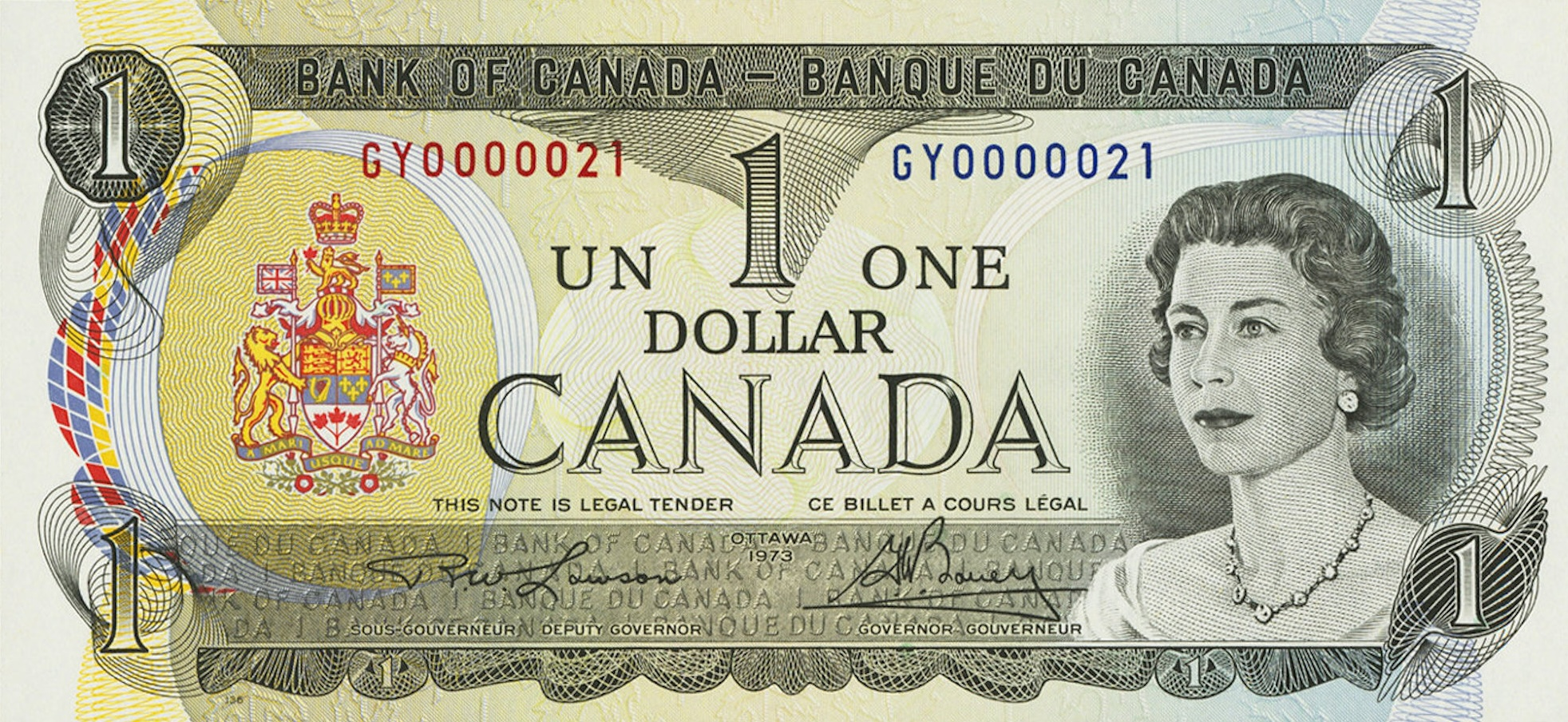
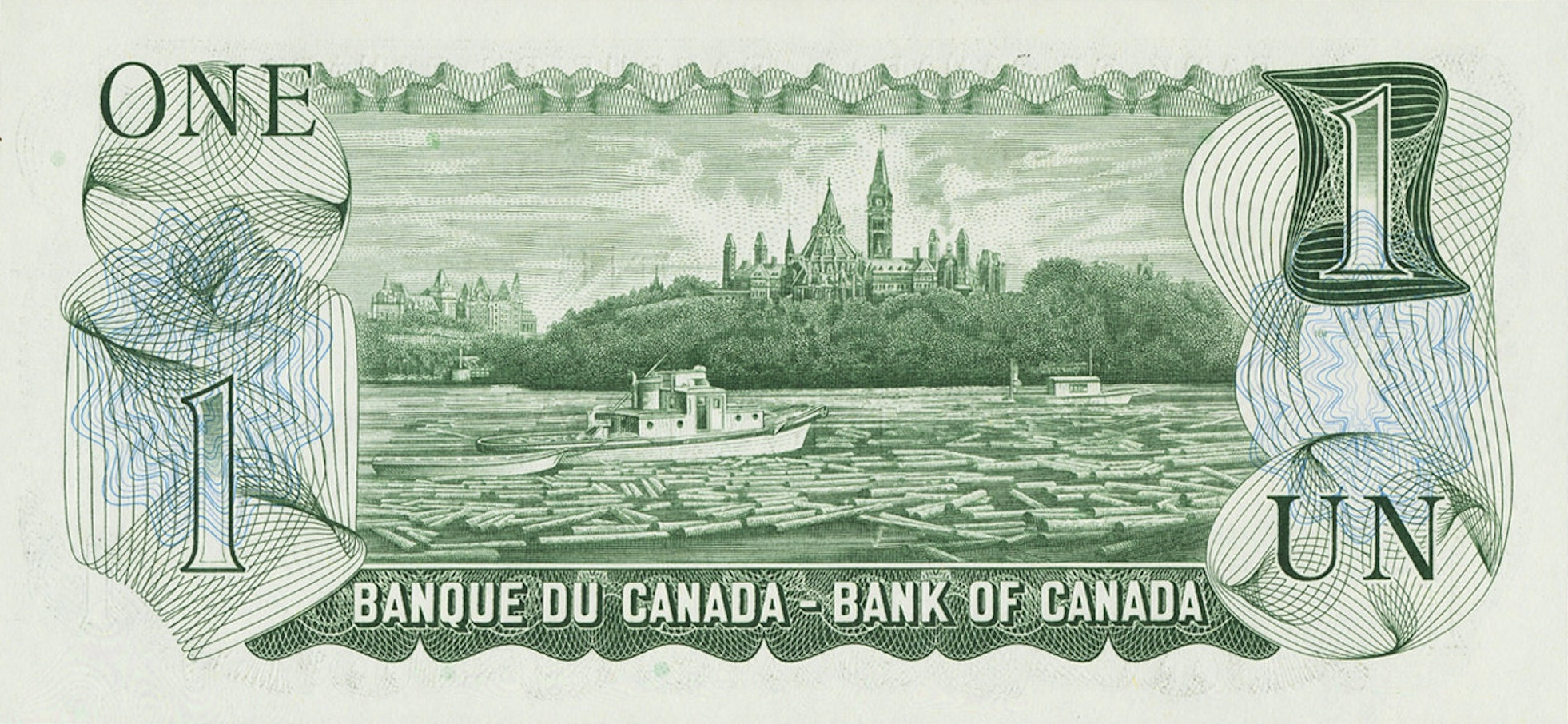
1974 one dollar note, Scenes of Canada series

Because of a growing concern over counterfeiting, the Bank of Canada began to release a new series of bank notes in 1969.

This series represented another complete departure in design from earlier issues:

- colourful, wavy patterns were introduced;
- a new series of Canadian scenic vignettes was created;
- portraits of former Canadian prime ministers were re-introduced. Both Laurier and Macdonald were on the 1935 and 1937 series, but now joined by King and Borden.

This was the last series to feature a $1 banknote, with the banknote replaced by a dollar coin – known as a loonie for its design of a loon on the reverse – in 1987; printing of the $1 banknote ceased in 1989. However, there was a 21-month period where both the $1 bill and coin were produced concurrently, from June 1987 to April 1989.

=== 1986 Birds of Canada ===
In 1986 the Bank of Canada introduced new banknotes called the Birds of Canada series. The design on the back of each note features a bird indigenous to Canada with a background representing the typical landscape for that bird. The portraits on the front of the note were made larger than those of previous series, and a metallic patch was introduced on the larger notes. Each banknote weighs 1 gram (0.035 oz). This series was the first to include a bar code with the serial number. This allows the visually impaired to distinguish notes with the use of a hand-held device that tells the note's denomination.

This was also the last series that the $2 and $1,000 notes were issued. The $2 note was withdrawn in 1996 and replaced by the $2 coin, known as the toonie. The $1,000 note was withdrawn by the Bank of Canada on 12 May 2000, at the request of the Royal Canadian Mounted Police (RCMP) as part of a program to reduce organized crime. At the time, 2,827,702 of the $1,000 bills were in circulation; by 2011, fewer than 1 million were in circulation, most held by organized crime.

=== 2001 Canadian Journey ===
Beginning in 2001, the Bank of Canada introduced a new series of notes called "Canadian Journey", featuring images of Canadian heritage and excerpts from Canadian literature. The $10 was first issued on 17 January 2001; the $5 on 27 March 2002; the $100 note on 17 March 2004, the $20 on 29 September 2004, and the $50 on 17 November 2004.

The $20, $50, and $100 notes introduce watermark security features for the first time on Canadian currency since the four-dollar Dominion notes; they also boast significantly expanded holographic security features. Also among the new features are a windowed colour-shifting thread woven into the paper, a see-through number, and enhanced fluorescence under ultraviolet lighting. These features are designed to help Canadians protect themselves by detecting counterfeit notes. All post-2001 series notes also include the EURion constellation, on both sides of the note. The new notes have a tactile feature, which is a series of raised dots (but not Braille) in the upper left corner on the face of each note to aid the visually impaired in identifying currency denominations.

The newer security features on the $20, $50, and $100 notes were added to an updated version of the $10 note released on 18 May 2005, and the Bank of Canada began issuing a $5 note with upgraded security features on 15 November 2006, as part of its ongoing effort to improve the security of Canadian bank notes. The illustrations on the front and back of the upgraded notes are the same as those on the $5 and $10 notes issued in 2001 and 2002.

The "Canadian Journey" literary excerpts are printed in English and French, with the English versions being:

- $5: The winters of my childhood were long, long seasons. We lived in three places—the school, the church, and the skating-rink—but our real life was on the skating-rink. (Roch Carrier (born 1937) from his short story Le chandail de hockey (The Hockey Sweater))
- $10: In Flanders Fields the poppies blow / Between the crosses, row on row, / That mark our place, and in the sky / The larks, still bravely singing, fly / Scarce heard amid the guns below. (John McCrae (1872–1918), from his poem In Flanders Fields)
- $20: Could we ever know each other in the slightest without the arts? (Gabrielle Roy (1909–1983) from her novel La Montagne secrète (The Hidden Mountain))
- $50: All human beings are born free and equal in dignity and rights (from Article 1 of the Universal Declaration of Human Rights, 1948)
- $100: Do we ever remember that somewhere above the sky in some child's dream perhaps Jacques Cartier is still sailing, always on his way always about to discover a new Canada? (Miriam Waddington (1917–2004) from her poem Jacques Cartier in Toronto)

Canadian Journey banknotes (2004 style) incorporates background colour and consists of series years 2001, 2003, 2003A, 2004, 2004A and 2006. All the notes except the $100 note have additional series years 2007, 2008, 2009 and 2009A (some banknotes only). The $100 2009 series began issuing to the public in early 2010 and was printed in 2009 before they were issued. The 2004 to 2009 series of the $100 note was withdrawn from the circulation in November 2011. The $50 note was withdrawn on 26 March 2012, and $5–$20 notes would be withdrawn in the next 2 years before it will be officially announced.

=== 2011 Frontier ===
Beginning in 2011, the Bank of Canada introduced a new series of polymer banknotes. The $100 note was issued on 14 November 2011; the $50 was issued on 26 March 2012; the $20 banknote was issued on 7 November 2012, and the $10 and $5 denominations were issued on 7 November 2013.

These are the first Canadian notes produced on polymer. In place of a watermark are two visual features: a translucent maple leaf and a transparent window. The leaf includes a security feature that, when viewed close to the eye with a single-point light source behind, produces a circular image displaying the note's denomination. The window is fringed by maple leaves; at its top is a smaller version of the portrait, and at its bottom a light-refracting metallic likeness of an architectural feature from the parliament buildings. The portraits on the face are more centred on the note. The backs of the notes introduce new cultural and thematic imagery, but the literary quotation is not continued. The polymer notes continue the tactile feature, from the Canadian Journey series.

=== 2018 Vertical ===
On International Women's Day 2016, Prime Minister Justin Trudeau announced that an iconic Canadian woman would be featured on one of the upcoming notes.

On 8 December 2016, the Government of Canada and the Bank of Canada announced that civil rights activist Viola Desmond would replace John A. Macdonald (who had been on the face of the $10 note since 1971) as the first non-royal woman to appear alone on a regularly circulated Bank of Canada note. This note was released to the public on 19 November 2018.

Beginning in 2018, newly designed Canadian banknotes (initially the $10 note) were vertical in orientation.

=== Commemorative issues ===
Commemorative issues
Value	Main colour	Description		Date of	
Value	Main colour	Front	Back	Printing	Issue
$25‡	Purple	King George V and Queen Mary	Windsor Castle	6 May 1935	
$1‡	Dark Green	Elizabeth II	Old parliament buildings in Ottawa – destroyed by fire in 1916	1967	3 January 1967+
$20	Green	Elizabeth II	Canadian National Vimy Memorial	2015	9 September 2015
$10	Purple	John A. Macdonald, George-Étienne Cartier, Agnes Macphail, James Gladstone	Variety of Canadian vistas	2017	1 June 2017

‡ Withdrawn from circulation. Most currency withdrawn from circulation is still legal tender. As of 1 January 2021, the $1, $2, $25, $500 and $1,000 bills from every Bank of Canada series are no longer legal tender. Despite the introduction of new notes, older notes are still in use.

+ Two varieties were printed, the first with conventional serial numbers, the second with the double date "1867–1967" appearing twice instead. Neither type is scarce. Both varieties also have on the obverse a stylized maple leaf with the double date below it.

All notes of the 1954 series or later measure 152.4 millimetres (6.00 in) by 69.85 millimetres (2.750 in).

See also Withdrawn Canadian banknotes.

== Myths ==
A number of myths have circulated regarding Canadian banknotes.

- An American flag is flying over the Parliament Buildings on Canadian paper money. This is not the case. The Birds series notes depict a Union Flag flying over Parliament on the $100; a Canadian Red Ensign (a former Canadian flag) on the $5, $10, and $50; and the modern maple-leaf flag was on the $2 notes. (The $20 depicts the Library of Parliament, with no flag visible.) Those fooled by the rumour were likely fooled by the notes with the Red Ensign, as the flags are very small and not shown in full colour, and the Ensign with its contrasting canton somewhat resembles the American flag.
- When a note depicts a past prime minister, the Parliament Buildings behind him are flying whichever flag Canada was using at the time of his tenure. The face of the Birds series featured images of prime ministers (or the Queen) and the Parliament Buildings. As noted above, however, the $10 note featured the Canadian Red Ensign alongside Sir John A. Macdonald, who became prime minister 25 years before the Canadian Red Ensign was approved for use by the Merchant Navy and more than 50 years before it was used on government buildings. Also, the Union Flag is on the $100 with Sir Robert Borden, who came after Laurier who appears with the Canadian Red Ensign. This is sometimes explained by the fact that Borden governed during World War I. The views of the Parliament Buildings on the current Canadian Journey series do not feature any flag.
- The Canadian Journey series $10 note is being recalled because there is a misprint in the poem In Flanders Fields. The first line as printed, "In Flanders fields the poppies blow," startled many people, who believed the last word should be "grow". John McCrae wrote two versions which were both published, but his original manuscript, the one used by the government and widely used for Remembrance Day ceremonies, reads "blow". (The last two lines are "We shall not sleep, though poppies grow/In Flanders fields.")
- The Canadian $20, $50, and $100 bills have a Norway maple leaf rather than the native maple leaf.
- The 2011 to present $100 bill was rumoured to be maple scented, although the Bank of Canada denies this.
