= Withdrawn Canadian banknotes =

Canadian banknotes no longer in circulation

Banknotes that are no longer in issue in Canada, and are being removed from circulation, are said to be "withdrawn from circulation".

== Current issues ==
The Bank of Canada, Canada's sole issuer of bank notes, currently issues five different denominations ($5, $10, $20, $50 and $100). Smaller denominations have been replaced by coins, and larger ones are felt to be no longer required in an era of electronic transmission of most large transactions. There are no plans to re-issue Canadian banknotes larger than $100.

== Defunct currency ==
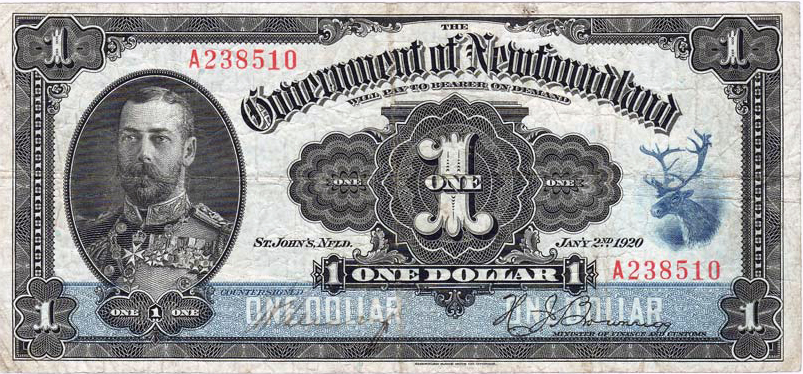
$1 Dominion of Newfoundland note issued in 1920

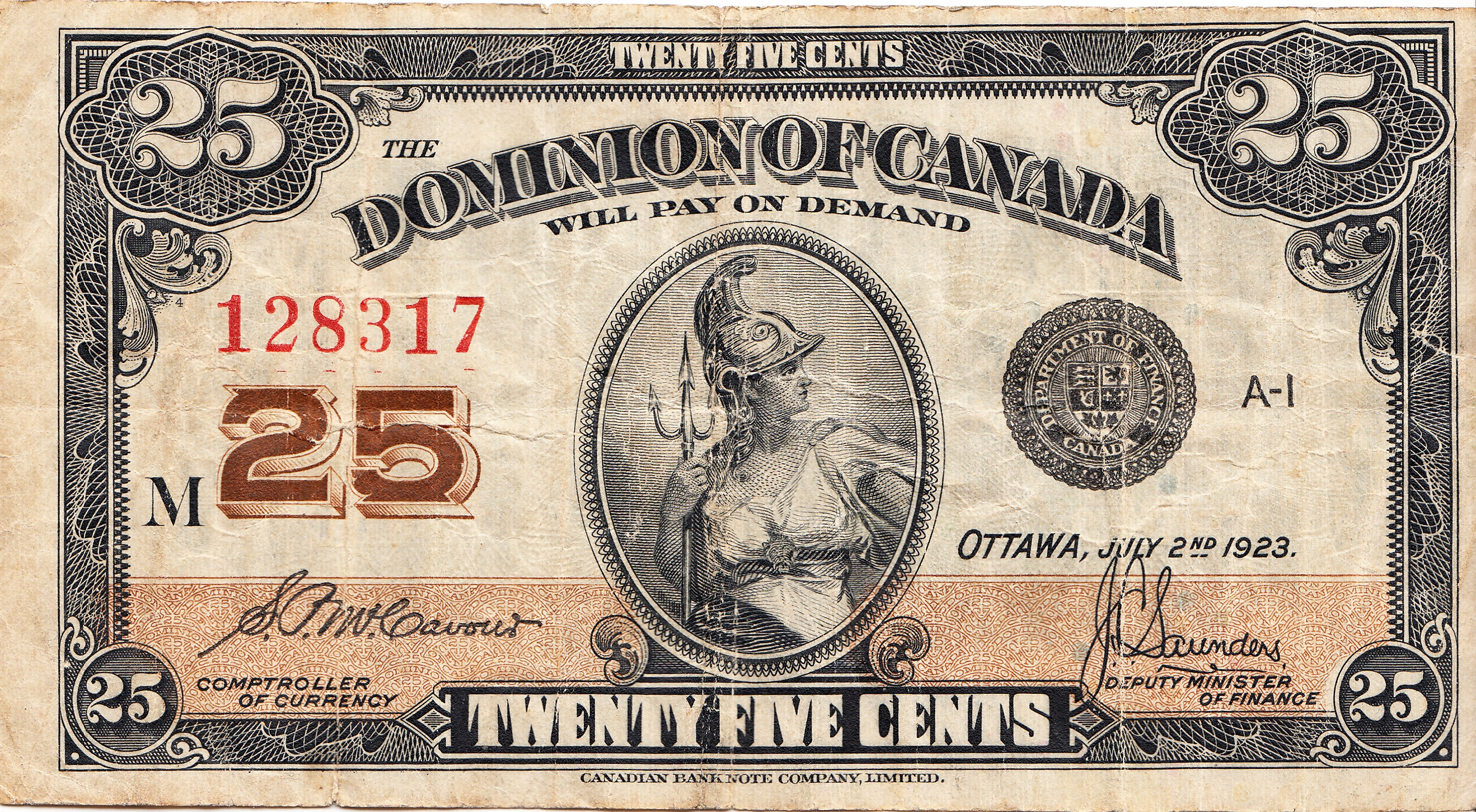
25¢ Dominion of Canada note issued in 1923

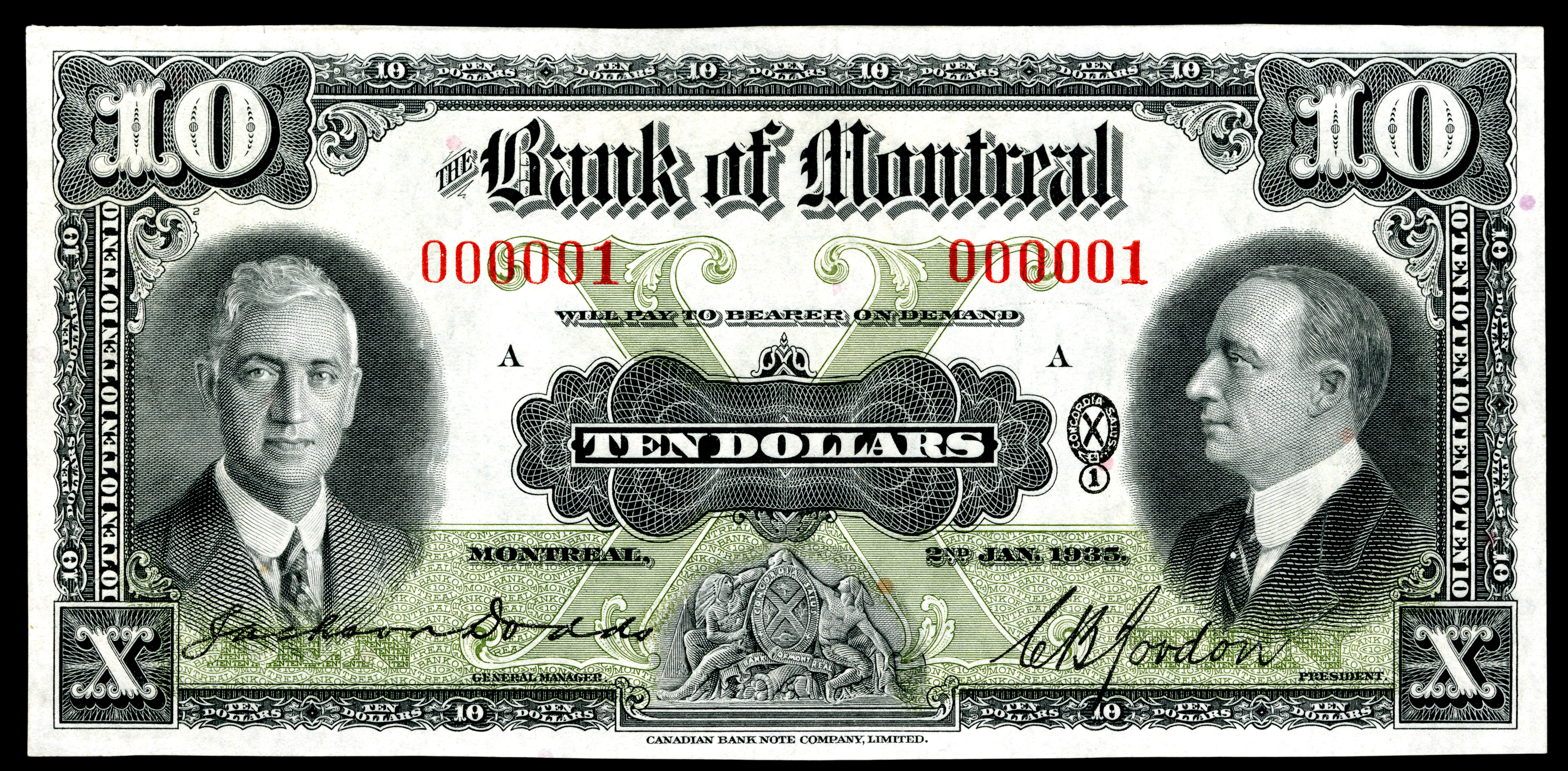
$10 Bank of Montreal note issued in 1935

Notes issued by these former issuing authorities are considered to be withdrawn from circulation:

- Colonial governments, prior to each entering Confederation.
- The Dominion of Canada between 1870 and 1935, which issued notes in denominations of 25¢, $1, $2, $4, $5, $50, $100, $500, and $1,000
- Canadian chartered banks, from pre-Confederation to 1944.

== Bank of Canada notes ==
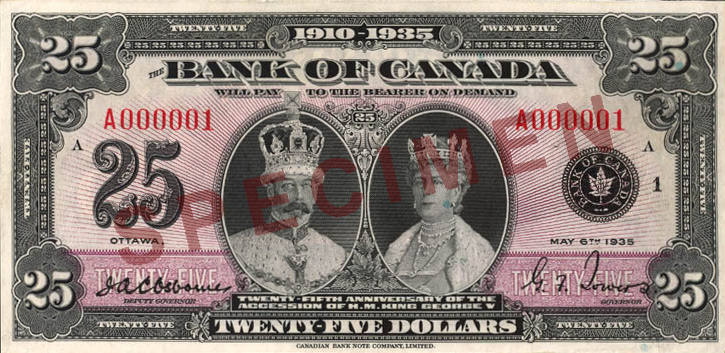
$25 Bank of Canada note issued in 1935

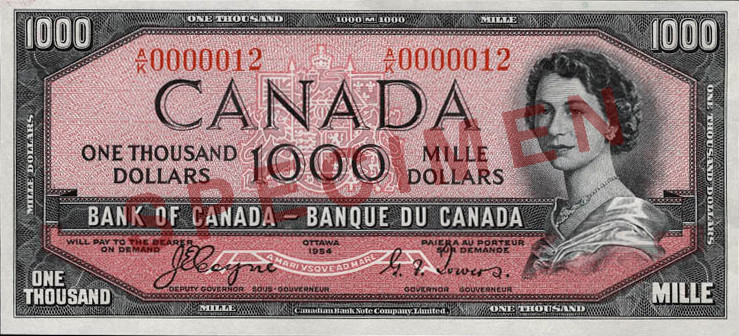
$1,000 Bank of Canada note issued in 1954

All Bank of Canada notes issued prior to the current Frontier Series are being withdrawn from circulation. The following Bank of Canada denominations included in previous series have been permanently retired, and as of January 1, 2021, these notes are no longer legal tender:

=== $25 ===
The $25 note was issued only in 1935, to commemorate the silver jubilee of King George V. As with other 1935 issues, separate English and French versions were printed. This was a limited release that was never printed in large quantities. The note was coloured an appropriate royal purple; both the King & his consort Queen Mary were featured, with Windsor Castle appearing on the back. The $25 note was withdrawn from circulation in 1937.

=== $500 ===
The $500 denomination was included only in the 1935 series. No note of this denomination has been printed since. The note was coloured sepia, or burnt sienna; the face featured Sir John A. Macdonald, and the back depicted a fertility allegory. The $500 note was withdrawn from circulation in 1938.

There had been two previous printings of the $500 note by the Dominion of Canada, one in 1925 featuring King George V, and one in 1911 picturing Queen Mary. Of the latter, only three are known to still exist, one of which sold for US$322,000 in a Heritage auction in October 2008. It is unlikely that further 1911 notes survived the Depression.

=== $1 ===
Printing of the $1 note ceased in 1989 after the release of the loonie (in 1987) had been implemented. These notes are virtually never seen in circulation today. The most recent banknote series that included the $1 note was the Scenes of Canada, with the $1 note released in 1974, coloured green and black. The face featured a portrait of Queen Elizabeth II; the back featured an image of Parliament Hill from across the Ottawa River, with log driving activities taking place on the water.

=== $2 ===
Printing of the $2 note ceased on February 18, 1996, with initial release of the toonie, a coin that replaced it. These notes are seldom seen in circulation today. The most recent banknote series that included the two-dollar note was the Birds of Canada series in 1986, in which this note was a terra cotta colour. The face featured a portrait of Queen Elizabeth II; the back featured a meadow scene with two robins.

=== $1,000 ===
Printing of the $1,000 note ceased in 2000. The denomination was withdrawn on the advice of the Solicitor General and the Royal Canadian Mounted Police (RCMP), as it was often used for money laundering and organized crime. The Bank of Canada has requested that financial institutions return $1,000 notes for destruction. The most recent issue of this denomination was in 1992 as part of the Birds of Canada series. It was pink in colour, featuring Queen Elizabeth II on the face, and two pine grosbeaks on the back.

== Status of withdrawn banknotes ==
Currency withdrawn from circulation remains legal tender, but this does not oblige any creditor to accept it as a medium of exchange. Withdrawn currency is usually exchanged at commercial bank branches, though some banks require that exchangers be bank customers. The bank then returns the withdrawn currency, together with worn out currency, to the Bank of Canada for destruction.

Liabilities for outstanding provincial and Dominion of Canada notes was transferred to the Bank of Canada in 1935, and liability for chartered bank notes in 1950. As of December 31, 2016, the total value of provincial, Dominion, chartered bank, and discontinued Bank of Canada denominations still outstanding is $1.139 billion, of which more than $765 million is in $1,000 notes. The liability for this amount remains on the Bank of Canada's books up to the present day.

On February 27, 2018, the Government of Canada announced in their 2018 Federal Budget that there are plans to make all withdrawn banknotes no longer legal tender. If passed into law, these notes will still retain face value and may still be redeemed at banks in exchange for current banknotes. The current five denominations—$5, $10, $20, $50 and $100—will not be affected at this time, but the government may decide to remove legal tender status from older series versions of these denominations in the future.

As of January 1, 2021, the $1, $2, $25, $500 and $1,000 bills from every series are no longer legal tender. All other prior Bank of Canada issued notes remain as legal tender.
