= Frontier (banknotes) =

2011 Canadian banknote series

Face sides of the 2011 Frontier series depicting Wilfrid Laurier ($5), John A. Macdonald ($10), Elizabeth II ($20), William Lyon Mackenzie King ($50), and Robert Borden ($100)

The Frontier (French: Frontières) series is the seventh series of banknotes of the Canadian dollar released by the Bank of Canada, first circulated in 2011. The polymer banknotes were designed for increased durability and to incorporate more security features over the preceding 2001 Canadian Journey series. The notes feature images that focus on historic Canadian achievements and innovation. Printed on polymer, the 2011 Frontier series was the first series issued by the Bank of Canada printed on a material other than paper. The 2011 Frontier series is being followed by the Vertical series.

The banknotes were designed by the Canadian Bank Note Company, which also prints the banknotes. They were revealed in June 2011. To familiarize Canadians with the new banknotes, each banknote was introduced through national and regional unveiling events and advertising campaigns before being put into circulation. The $100 banknote was released into circulation on 14 November 2011, the $50 banknote on 26 March 2012, and the $20 banknote on 7 November 2012. The $5 banknote was unveiled by Chris Hadfield from the International Space Station during Expedition 35 and first circulated on 7 November 2013. The $10 banknote was first circulated the same day after a ceremony at Pacific Central Station in Vancouver.

At the time of its adoption of the technology, Canada was the largest of over 30 nations, and the first G8 country, to use polymer thin films for printing currency.

== Background ==
The primary impetus for the new banknotes was "the need to stay ahead of counterfeiters". By 2002, 10% of retailers in some parts of Canada refused to accept the $100 banknotes of the 1986 Birds of Canada series in financial transactions, and by 2004, the counterfeit ratio for Canadian currency had risen to 470 parts per million (ppm). As of 2011, over half of all retail transactions in Canada were made using cash.

Between 1995 and 1998, the Bank of Canada tested a substrate trademarked as "Luminus" consisting of a polymer core sheet layered between two paper sheets for use in printing banknotes. It printed 100,000 experimental $5 Birds of Canada banknotes. In June 1998, the Bank of Canada prepared to use Luminus as the substrate for the 2001 Canadian Journey series, but in December 1999, the manufacturer withdrew its supply bid because it could not produce the substrate at the scale required by the Bank of Canada for printing banknotes. The bank printed the 2001 Canadian Journey series on a cotton fibre substrate with similar surface characteristics to Luminus so that it could transition production to using the polymer substrate when scale production issues were resolved. The Bank of Canada also secured Canadian rights for Luminus and continued to develop the substrate for future use.

The use of polymer as a substrate was considered in part because access to the polymer substrate could be controlled, and replicating the chemical and physical recipe would be difficult. The practice of restricting access to the substrate used for manufacturing money existed as early as the 13th century, during which Chinese rulers stationed guards at mulberry forests, as mulberry bark was used to produce paper money.

Use of a polymer substrate in the upcoming banknotes was announced by Jim Flaherty in the 2010 Canadian federal budget speech on 4 March 2010, at which time he also announced that in the future the loonie ($1 coin) and toonie ($2 coin) would be made of steel instead of nickel to reduce manufacturing costs. Canada became the ninth country to print all its banknotes using a polymer substrate, following Australia, Bermuda, Brunei, New Zealand, Nicaragua, Papua New Guinea, Romania, and Vietnam.

== Development ==
The Bank of Canada began planning for the Frontier series in 2005. It used a team of chemists, physicists, and engineers it had assembled for the development of the 2001 Canadian Journey series to determine potential counterfeiting threats and assess substrate materials and potential security features for use in banknote designs. Once the technical evaluation of materials and security features was complete, the Bank of Canada created a formal set of guidelines specifying "the combination of security features and substrate" that it issued to bank note manufacturing and design companies. The resultant bid designs were evaluated for technical, security, and financial merit.

Once the design and substrate were chosen, the Bank of Canada negotiated a contract with Note Printing Australia (NPA) for the supply of the substrate polymer and the security features implemented in the design. The substrate is supplied to NPA by Securency International (now known as Innovia Films Ltd). The Bank also negotiated for the rights to the use of intellectual property associated with the material and security features owned by the Reserve Bank of Australia. The Bank of Canada issued a press release stating its intention to issue new banknotes in 2011.

A study commissioned by the Bank of Canada was conducted by the University of Waterloo, which collaborated with the Canadian National Institute for the Blind, to assess the accessibility features of the Canadian Journey banknotes. The results led to the implementation of two improvements to the design—increased durability of the raised dots used for identification and placing identification patterns for electronic banknote scanners at both ends of the banknotes.

The Bank of Canada tested the prototype banknotes by exposing them to temperatures in the range −75 to 140 °C (−103 to 284 °F). The durability test involved boiling, freezing, and running the banknotes in a washing machine.

By the end of the development cycle, nearly 15 million test banknotes of various designs, implementing different security features, and using various substrates and techniques, had been printed. Research and testing for printing currency on the polymer substrate cost about CA$20 million, and overall development of the polymer banknotes cost about $300 million.

== Design ==
In 2008, the Bank of Canada hired the Strategic Counsel, a market research firm, for $476,000 to create an image catalogue from which banknote images would be drawn. The firm polled focus groups in six cities, finding that themes related to diversity and multiculturalism had strong support. This resulted in 41 images reflecting eight themes being presented to the Bank of Canada.

The designs for the banknotes were created by the Canadian Bank Note Company. The Bank of Canada consulted various organizations for the design and depiction of elements appearing on the banknotes, including: the Canadian Space Agency for the $5 banknote; Via Rail and the Railway Association of Canada for the $10 banknote; Veterans Affairs Canada and the Vimy Foundation for the $20 banknote; ArcticNet, the Canadian Coast Guard, and Inuit Tapiriit Kanatami for the $50 banknote; and the Banting and Best Diabetes Centre, Canada Foundation for Innovation, Ottawa Hospital Research Institute, Sanofi Pasteur Canada, University of Ottawa, University of Ottawa Heart Institute, University of Toronto, and University of Toronto Faculty of Medicine for the $100 banknote.

From late 2009 to early 2012, the prototype designs were shown to 30 focus groups in Calgary, Fredericton, Montreal, and Toronto on a $53,000 contract by the Strategic Counsel to discover "potential controversies". Feedback from the focus groups led to some changes to the design, and results of the study were released to the public in 2012. The report stated that themes of diversity, inclusiveness, acceptance of others, and multiculturalism had strong support in the focus groups. The highest-rated images included two of children of different ethnic backgrounds building a snowman and playing hockey, and of faces of individuals from different cultures celebrating Canada Day. The focus groups rejected images such as aboriginal art, ice wine, and portraits of Terry Fox, Tommy Douglas, and Lester B. Pearson. All focus groups thought the large window resembled a woman's body.

A set of 41 images in several themes was presented to the Department of Finance, which selected the final designs. Rejected images included illustrations of a gay marriage and a Royal Canadian Mounted Police (RCMP) officer wearing a turban. The images and themes that were chosen were meant to represent Canadian accomplishments in science, technology, and exploration. The themes for the final designs were announced to the public at a media event on 20 June 2011 by Mark Carney, the Governor of the Bank of Canada, Jim Flaherty, the Minister of Finance, and William J. S. Elliott, commissioner of the RCMP.

=== Accessibility ===
Arrangement of raised dots for each denomination of the series

Each banknote has a raised dot identification pattern, which is not braille, on the top left corner of the obverse usable for identification by individuals with visual impairments. The raised dots were expected to have greater endurance than those of previous series because of the greater durability of the polypropylene substrate. At each end of the banknotes, a symmetrical arc contains codes that enable identification using a specialized portable electronic banknote scanner. Other accessibility features include a distinct and dominant colour scheme for each denomination and large numerals displayed against a contrasting background

== Production ==
The banknotes are manufactured by Ottawa-based company Canadian Bank Note Company and by the former BA International. They are made from a single sheet of polymer substrate branded as "Guardian" manufactured by Innovia Films, which is the only supplier of the substrate for the Frontier series, based on a polymer developed in Australia and used by Note Printing Australia to print the banknotes of the Australian dollar since 1988. The material is less likely to tear than cotton-based paper and is more crumple resistant and water resistant. The polymer notes are made of recyclable biaxially-oriented polypropylene (BOPP).

Each polymer banknote cost 19 cents to print, more than the paper-based banknotes of previous series, but were expected to last 2 1/2 times longer, about 7 1/2 years, reducing overall costs for banknote production. The Bank of Canada expected to save about 25% on production costs (about $200 million) compared to printing paper money with similar counterfeiting resistance.

=== Substrate ===
Polypropylene and other polyolefin pellets are extruded and combined to create a molten polymer, which consists of a 37.5μm thick polypropylene sheet sandwiched between two 0.1μm polyolefin sheets, creating a thin film 37.7 μm thick. This is gravity-fed through a snap-cooling brass mandrel, reheater, blown into a large bubble using air pressure and temperature, and collapsed at the base of the four-storey chamber into a flat sheet by convergence rollers; the sheet is then slit. This creates the base biaxially-oriented polypropylene substrate of 75.4 μm thickness, called ClarityC by Innovia Films.

Two 3 μm thick layers of white opacifier are applied to the upper and lower surface of the substrate, except for masked areas that are intended to remain transparent. These overcoat layers protect the substrate from soiling and impart on it its characteristic texture and increase the overall thickness to 87.5 μm. The resulting product is the Guardian substrate.

The holographic security foil is then incorporated into the base substrate. This is then cut, and the sheets are spooled onto a roll that is transported to the banknote printing companies in wooden boxes as a secure shipment.

=== Printing ===
Printing banknotes involves several ordered stages. These include acquisition and preparation of necessary materials, prepress activities, printing, and post-printing operations. Some of the operations are "unique to the security printing industry".

Prepress activities include creation of the wet and dry plates for lithographic printing, the image and ink transfer plates, and establishing the electroforming and electroplating process for intaglio. The cylinder and roller plates are coated or etched with the unique designs for the banknotes. Inks are prepared using a "mixture of varnishes, pigments and additives".

The printing process involves the substrate passing through presses for lithographic printing, intaglio printing, numbering printing, and varnish printing. The inks are transferred using the prepared plates, which are replaced when worn. The opacifier layers enable the inks of the offset and intaglio printing to adhere to the substrate. The varnish printing stage applies a required protective varnish to the polymer substrate. Offset printing deposits a 1.5 μm layer, intaglio about 24 μm, and the protective varnish is about 2 μm thick.

Once printing is complete, the banknotes undergo a finishing stage in which they are cut and are then packaged. The packages are stacked on a pallet that is then bound in plastic wrap and strapped.

== Banknotes ==
The 2011 Frontier banknotes have the same colour as those of the same denomination in the 2001 Canadian Journey series. Use of the polymer substrate results in banknotes with a smoother texture than previous paper-based banknotes but are the same size and of similar thickness. Frontier banknotes weigh 0.93 grams (0.03 oz) and are 91 micrometres (0.0036 in) thick, compared to 2001 Canadian Journey banknotes that weigh 1.02 grams (0.04 oz) and are 115 micrometres (0.0045 in) thick. All banknotes have dimensions of 152.4 by 69.85 millimetres (6.00 by 2.75 in).

The portraits appearing on the banknotes are of the same personalities as those of the respective denomination of the 2001 Canadian Journey series but are oriented so they look at the viewer.

The 2011 Frontier series is the first series issued by the Bank of Canada printed on a material other than paper, and Canada is now one of over 30 nations using polymer thin films for printing currency. To familiarize Canadians with the new banknotes, each denomination was introduced through national and regional unveiling events and advertising campaigns before being put into circulation. The banknotes are non-porous and were expected to remain cleaner as they would not absorb sweat, oils, or other liquids and would stay in circulation longer than paper-based banknotes.

Value	Main colour	Obverse	Reverse	Series year	Issued	Withdrawn
$5	Blue	Wilfrid Laurier	Canadarm2 and Dextre	2013	7 November 2013	
$10	Purple	John A. Macdonald	The Canadian passenger train	2013	7 November 2013	
$20	Green	Queen Elizabeth II	Canadian National Vimy Memorial and poppies	2012	7 November 2012	
$50	Red	William Lyon Mackenzie King	CCGS Amundsen in arctic waters, a map of Canada's North, and the word 'Arctic' in Inuktitut (ᐅᑭᐅᖅᑕᖅᑐᖅ, ukiuqtaqtuq)	2012	26 March 2012	
$100	Brown	Robert Borden	Medical research, invention of the pacemaker, a DNA double helix, and a vial of insulin	2011	14 November 2011	

=== $5 note ===
The reverse of the $5 banknote

The $5 note is blue, and the obverse features a portrait of Wilfrid Laurier, the Prime Minister of Canada between 1896 and 1911. It is based on a photograph in the collections of Library and Archives Canada. The building in the holographic metallic foil is the West Block of Parliament Hill, based on a photograph commissioned by the Bank of Canada.

The reverse features simplified renderings of the Canadarm2 and Dextre, reflecting Canada's contribution to the International Space Station program. The depiction of the astronaut represents "all Canadians who have contributed to the space program and the scientific research conducted on board the International Space Station", and thus omits all mission and rank identification other than the Canadian flag patch. The image is a simplified rendering based on a photograph from the Canadian Space Agency. Five stars are dispersed throughout the reverse, representing the denomination, and a rendering of Earth showing Canada and the Great Lakes based on an image from Natural Resources Canada is visible beneath the astronaut and Mobile Servicing System.

==== Unveiling ====
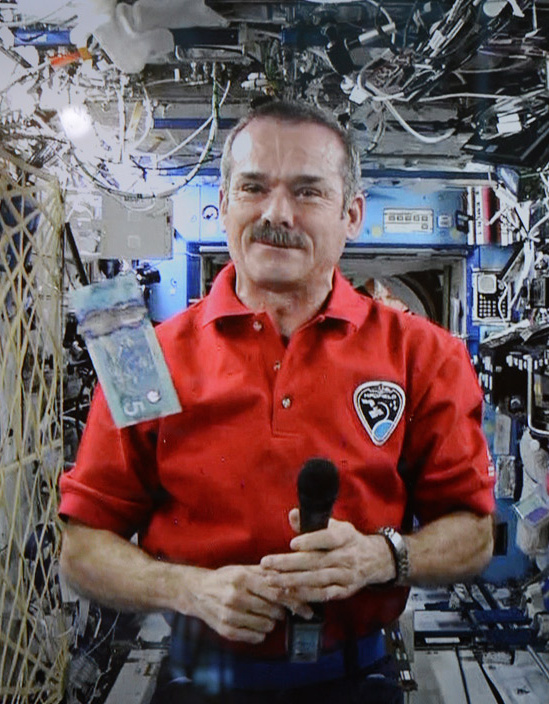
Chris Hadfield during unveiling of the $5 banknote from the International Space Station on 30 April 2013

The prototype $5 banknote with no serial number was unveiled by Chris Hadfield on 30 April 2013 from the International Space Station during Expedition 35. It was first issued after a national ceremony hosted by Hadfield and Mark Carney, then Governor of the Bank of Canada, from the Canadian Space Agency headquarters in Saint-Hubert, Quebec on 7 November 2013. Planning and coordination for the event began in February 2012, when representatives from the Bank of Canada and the Canadian Space Agency met to discuss "on-orbit outreach activities and an unveiling event". Choosing Hadfield to unveil the note was considered "particularly fitting", as Hadfield had installed the Canadarm2 during the Space Shuttle Endeavour mission STS-100 on 22 April 2001. (Note: Do 2014, p. 1. "Representatives from the two departments met as early as February 2012 to discuss plans for 'on-orbit outreach activities and an unveiling event', according to documents obtained by CBC News under the Access to Information Act.")

Bank of Canada Chief of Currency Gerry Gaetz was required by NASA to sign an agreement that the banknote brought to the International Space Station would not be "sold or used for fundraising purposes". Banknotes and coins are not usually part of the Official Flight Kit, but NASA approved bringing the banknote to the ISS once the agreement was signed. Bank of Canada representatives brought the prototype banknote and a contract to Hadfield at the Canadian Space Agency headquarters on 4 October 2012. The contract stipulated that the banknote must be in Hadfield's possession or secured at all times. Hadfield travelled to the Baikonur Cosmodrome in Kazakhstan, where he, Thomas Marshburn, and Roman Romanenko were launched aboard Soyuz TMA-07M on 19 December 2012 and docked with the ISS.

Originally, Hadfield was to record a video which would be broadcast during the unveiling ceremony, but on 7 March 2013, the plan was changed because an executive at the Bank of Canada wanted a live event. By 12 March, the new plan was in place. The plan was scripted to include press conference speeches by Jim Flaherty and Mark Carney, the latter of whom would be interrupted by a phone call revealed to be from Hadfield. Contingency plans were created in case a communications link to the ISS could not be established (the "green script"), or if it was interrupted or failed at any point (the "blue script"). These were unnecessary, but Flaherty finished his speech early and requested the media to wait because "something is supposed to happen", saying "Hallelujah" when the phone rang.

The communications link for the event cost over $9,000, and other audiovisual services cost $4,000. The prototype banknote unveiled by Hadfield on the International Space Station was returned to the Bank of Canada on 7 November 2013, which put it in its Currency Museum.

=== $10 note ===
The reverse of the $10 banknote

The $10 note is violet, and the obverse features a portrait of John A. Macdonald, the first Prime Minister of Canada from 1867 to 1873, and later from 1878 to 1891, and one of the Fathers of Confederation. It is based on a photograph in the collections of Library and Archives Canada. The building in the holographic metallic foil is the Library of Parliament, based on a photograph commissioned by the Bank of Canada.

The reverse features the passenger train Canadian passing through the Canadian Rockies, symbolizing the country's monumental feat of building a pan-Canadian railway. The depiction of the train is based on a photograph commissioned by the Bank of Canada taken at Jasper National Park in Alberta. The banknote designers retained the locomotive identifier 6403 in the design. The depiction of the Canadian Rockies is a composite rendering based on photographs of several notable peaks and ridges: reading from the left are the shoulder of Lectern Peak and Aquila Mountain; Redan, Esplanade and Gargoyle mountains in the centre, and Mount Zengel, part of the Victoria Cross Range, in the right. On announcing the design in 2013, the Bank of Canada had originally said the image included Mount Edith Cavell and Marmot Mountain to the left of the transparent window, Esplanade Mountain to the right of the transparent window, and Palisade Mountain and Pyramid Mountain of the Victoria Cross Ranges. However, a query led the Bank to issue a correction in July 2014. A simplified adaptation of a map of the Via Rail network of passenger trains provided by Natural Resources Canada is visible between the transparent window and the image of the train.

The banknote was first circulated on 7 November 2013, the 128th anniversary of the ceremonial last spike driven into the Canadian Pacific Railway (CPR) at Craigellachie, British Columbia. A national ceremony hosted by Deputy Governor of the Bank of Canada Tiff Macklem and the chief executive officer of Via Rail Marc Laliberté at the Pacific Central Station in Vancouver was held that day.

A unique commemorative banknote was issued for the 150th anniversary of Canada in 2017, with a circulation of 40 million. The obverse features four portraits: John A. Macdonald, George-Étienne Cartier, Agnes MacPhail, and James Gladstone, and the "Canada 150" logo at upper right. The reverse depicts five landscapes: The Lions and Capilano Lake; fields of Prairie wheat; the Canadian Shield in Quebec; the Atlantic coast at Cape Bonavista; and northern lights in Wood Buffalo National Park. The holographic window includes the national coat of arms and a representation of the artwork Owl's Bouquet by Inuk artist Kenojuak Ashevak. It was first issued on 1 June 2017.

=== $20 note ===
The reverse of the $20 banknote

The $20 note is green, and the obverse features a portrait of the Queen of Canada, Elizabeth II, based on a photograph commissioned by the Bank of Canada in the 2000s. It received approval from Elizabeth II for use on the banknote. The building in the holographic metallic foil is the Peace Tower of Parliament Hill, based on a photograph commissioned by the Bank of Canada.

The reverse features the Canadian National Vimy Memorial, reflecting the contributions of Canada in conflicts throughout its military history. The memorial was erected on the highest point of Vimy Ridge on land permanently granted to Canada by the Government of France in 1922 to honour Canadian military service during World War I. The image is a rendering based on a photograph commissioned by the Bank of Canada. The reverse also features an artistic rendition of poppies and a Canadian flag waving. A report of the focus group study stated that most Canadians either did not recognize or were unaware of the Vimy Memorial, and thought the image represented the twin towers of the World Trade Center, though most Canadians recognized the name Vimy. Other focus group members stated concerns about nudity and pornography, both concerns in relation to the sculptures of nude women atop the memorial structure representing peace (Pax) and Lady Justice.

The obverse and reverse of the versions of the banknotes to commemorate Elizabeth II becoming the longest-reigning monarch of the United Kingdom and Canada

The banknote was unveiled and released into circulation at a national ceremony at the Canadian War Museum in Ottawa, and also at several regional events, on 7 November 2012. On 9 September 2015, the Bank of Canada released a modified version of the banknote to commemorate Elizabeth II becoming the longest-reigning monarch of the United Kingdom and Canada. It is derived from the standard $20 2011 Frontier banknote, but replaces the images on the metallic foil with the royal cypher of Elizabeth II and a portrait of Elizabeth II adapted from a 1951 photograph by Yousuf Karsh. It was the first Canadian banknote to depict Elizabeth II wearing a tiara. This portrait was also used for the obverse of all banknotes of the 1954 Canadian Landscape series, including both variants of the Centennial $1 banknote issued in 1967 for the Canadian Centennial, but the engraving created for those banknotes excluded the tiara.

=== $50 note ===
The reverse of the $50 banknote

The $50 note is red, and the obverse features a portrait of William Lyon Mackenzie King, the Prime Minister of Canada between 1921 and 1930 and again between 1935 and 1948. It is based on a photograph in the collections of Library and Archives Canada. The building in the holographic metallic foil is the Centre Block of Parliament Hill, based on a photograph commissioned by the Bank of Canada.

The reverse features images focusing on the Canadian Coast Guard Ship Amundsen in the Arctic, reflecting Canada's northern frontier and its role in Arctic research. The image is based on a photograph commissioned by the Bank of Canada taken on the Saint Lawrence River near the Canadian Coast Guard base in Quebec City. The syllabic text "ᐅᑭᐅᖅᑕᖅᑐᖅ" appearing above the image of the ship is the Inuktitut syllabic representation of the Inuktitut word "ukiuqtaqtuq", meaning "arctic". The background contains a simplified adaptation of a map of Northern Canada provided by Natural Resources Canada and an artistic rendering of a navigational compass.

The banknote was unveiled and released into circulation at a national ceremony at the Canadian Coast Guard port facility in Quebec, and also at several regional events, on 26 March 2012. CCGS Amundsen was docked at port for the ceremony. It was nominated for International Bank Note Society Banknote of 2012 and was ultimately runner-up to the Kazakhstani 5000 tenge banknote.

=== $100 note ===
The reverse of the $100 banknote

The $100 note is brown, and the obverse features a portrait of Robert Borden, Prime Minister of Canada between 1911 and 1920. It is based on a photograph in the collections of Library and Archives Canada. The building in the holographic metallic foil is the East Block of Parliament Hill, based on a photograph commissioned by the Bank of Canada.

The reverse features images focusing on Canadian innovation in medicine. In the centre is a drawing of a researcher or scientist using a microscope based on the Carl Zeiss AG Axioplan 2 imaging microscope. It represents "all the men and women who have contributed" to medical research in Canada. The bottle of insulin, based on a 1923 photograph of one of the earliest bottles of the protein, represents the discovery of the peptide hormone by Canadians Frederick Banting and Charles Best in 1921. Similarly, the electrocardiogram track of the beat of a healthy human heart represents the 1950 invention of the pacemaker by John Alexander Hopps, the "father of Canadian biomedical engineering". The DNA strand is adapted from a computer-generated image created by the University of Ottawa; it honours the researchers who have contributed to the mapping of the human genome and is meant to evoke the future of medical innovation in Canada rather than its history.

The image of the scientist was revised based on comments and details of the focus group study showing that some Canadians were concerned about the Asian appearance of the scientist as originally drawn. Some Canadians were concerned about a potential ethnic stereotype of Asians. For the Montreal focus group, "the inclusion of an Asian without representing any other ethnicities was seen to be contentious", whereas the Toronto focus group deemed it to "represent diversity or multiculturalism". One Vancouver focus group perceived the double helix of the DNA strand as anal beads, and others thought it was the Big Dipper.

The banknote was unveiled and released into circulation at a national ceremony at the MaRS Discovery District in Toronto on 14 November 2011. The date was chosen because it was World Diabetes Day and the birthday of Frederick Banting. It was the first of the 2011 Frontier banknotes to be released because the same denomination in the 1986 Birds of Canada and 2001 Canadian Journey series had become "a favourite target of counterfeiters". By 2013, counterfeit versions of the banknote had been found in circulation in the Lower Mainland of British Columbia.

It was nominated for International Bank Note Society Banknote of 2011 and was ultimately runner-up to the Kazakh 10,000 tenge banknote.

== Security ==
The banknotes feature a large clear window through which passes a stripe of holographic metallic foil that changes colour based on angle. The holographic foil contains an image of one of the Parliament buildings at its base and a coloured duplicate of the portrait appearing on the banknote at the top. Both portions of the metallic foil contain the words "BANK OF CANADA", "BANQUE DU CANADA", and several repetitions of the value of the denomination appearing in different colours depending on the viewing angle. The metallic foil portrait is the same as the larger portrait on the banknote, but shifts colour when the banknote is tilted. The holographic foil is manufactured using a mix of aluminum, polyethylene terephthalate (PET), and adhesives.

A frosted window in the shape of a maple leaf is included at the other end of the note. Within the maple leaf is a ring of numbers matching the denomination of the banknote that become visible when the obverse is observed with a backlight. Hidden numbers also appear in the large window and holographic foil, some in reverse. The translucent maple leaf has a thin, transparent outline through which is visible the pattern of the reverse.

Other security features include a border consisting of maple leaves around and intruding into parts of the large window, and transparent text printed in raised ink in the window. The raised ink is printed using intaglio and is also used for the large numerals to the left of the portrait, the shoulders of the portrait, and the words "BANK OF CANADA" and "BANQUE DU CANADA" printed near the maple leaf border. The transparent word "Canada" in the large window is also raised.

Each denomination contains the EURion constellation on both the obverse and reverse to deter counterfeiting by reproduction using imaging software and photocopiers. The 2011 Frontier series is the second Canadian banknote series to include it after the 2001 Canadian Journey series. On the obverse, the pattern occurs flanking the transparent window, with denominations having the same pattern on the right and different patterns on the left. On the reverse, it occurs in the lower strip containing the banknote's serial number.

=== Counterfeiting ===
The security features in the Frontier series make counterfeiting the banknotes more difficult than counterfeiting banknotes from earlier series.

By late 2011, the $100 banknote had been counterfeited, and the Royal Canadian Mounted Police arrested four individuals of a counterfeiting operation in Richmond, British Columbia, and seized partially completed, counterfeit $100 banknotes with a face value of $1.2 million. In May 2013, counterfeit $100 banknotes were found in circulation in New Westminster and other parts of the Lower Mainland in British Columbia. They were described by New Westminster police sergeant Diana McDaniel as "very well done", but they were missing three security features in the reproduction—a line of printed numerals in the transparent window, the flag atop the East Block in the lower metallic foil, and the raised ink. About 175 copies of the banknotes were found in circulation.

By May 2013, there were 56 cases of counterfeit banknotes known to the Bank of Canada. Offences related to the production, printing, publication, possession, distribution, use, or circulation of counterfeit currency, or owning, repairing, or using machines or other tools used for the production of counterfeit currency are part of section XII, Offences relating to currency, of the Criminal Code, in sections 448–462. The RCMP maintains a National Anti-Counterfeiting Bureau (NACB) to coordinate policing regarding counterfeit currency, and is the central repository for seized counterfeit money. NACB also has the responsibility for destroying all counterfeit currency once it has been analyzed and is no longer needed for court proceedings.

== Reception ==
The banknote designs were criticised by Keith Rushton, chairman of the graphic design department at the Ontario College of Art and Design, as being "trite, banal, ordinary and not too inspiring". Botanist Sean Blaney told the Canadian Broadcasting Corporation that the depiction of the maple leaf on the banknote is that of an invasive five-lobed Norway Maple, not a maple tree indigenous to Canada such as the three-lobed sugar maple. A spokesperson for the Bank of Canada stated that the design was "a stylized blend of different Canadian maple species". The 2009 focus group report stated that the image of the train on the $10 banknote was attractive but uninspiring and outdated, and it drew complaints from people in Atlantic Canada where many "railway links have been decommissioned".

Automated teller machines, vending machines, note-sorting equipment, ticket and parking lot machines, slot machines, self-checkout machines, and other banknote processing equipment had to be upgraded to process the polymer banknotes, a process that began six months before the introduction of the banknotes. The Bank of Canada provided sample bills to 85 equipment manufacturing companies so they could update the software that operates the machines. By the time the $20 banknote was released into circulation, vending machines operated by about half of the members of the Canadian Automatic Merchandising Association did not accept the Frontier banknotes. Some vending machine operators waited until the release of all the banknotes before updating their machines. Once the update software was tested, reprogramming each machine consisted of an automated task requiring an on-site visit by a technician. Sabbir Kabir of the Canadian National Vending Alliance stated that the sample banknotes were not the same as those introduced into circulation, such as the image being offset in one version or each printing being cut differently. The offset problem was fixed in December 2012. The Bank of Canada expected the industry to spend between $75 and $100 million to update machines to process the polymer banknotes.

In 2013, during the introduction of the Frontier $5, $20 and $100 bills, discussions regarding the new series compared the smell of the polymer notes to maple syrup. Some also claimed that the notes were melting in hot summer temperatures, though the melting point of the polypropylene used in the composition of the notes is significantly higher than can be achieved in most domestic settings.

In July 2013, a petition organized by historian Merna Forster and addressed to Stephen Poloz and Jim Flaherty campaigned to have the Bank of Canada feature "significant Canadian women" on banknotes. It drew support from famous Canadian women, including Margaret Atwood, Kim Cattrall and Cynthia Dale, and from several Members of Parliament, including Bruce Hyer, Peggy Nash, and Murray Rankin. It was also supported by the Because I am a Girl campaign. The petition was started because of the exclusion of women from the banknote designs and stated that earlier banknotes included women, such as the fifty-dollar banknote of the 2001 Canadian Journey series which featured The Famous Five and Thérèse Casgrain on the reverse. The petition was delivered to Poloz, who stated that the Bank of Canada was "absolutely open to the idea" of incorporating portraits of famous Canadian women in future banknote series. Poloz sent a reply letter to Forster on 4 November 2013. In March 2018, the first bill in the Vertical series, the ten-dollar bill featuring Viola Desmond, was announced.

A spokeswoman for the Chinese Canadian National Council stated that the revisions to the image of the scientist on the $100 banknote reflected the Bank of Canada "caving to ... racist feedback". A Bank of Canada spokesperson later apologized for the change.

The media reported various complaints about the banknotes, including that new banknotes stuck together, some vending machines did not recognize or accept them, and that they may melt when exposed to high heat. An individual will be reimbursed for a damaged banknote only if the banknote's serial number is known. A report by the Calgary Herald based on an informal survey it conducted in 2013 stated that Calgarians complained about the "same old faces, and the same old colours".

== Legacy ==
As each banknote was put into circulation, the same denomination from earlier banknote series began being withdrawn from circulation by the Bank of Canada. The Bank of Canada expected the 2011 Frontier series to become the dominant banknotes in circulation by late 2015 or early 2016, with at least 70% of older $20 banknotes removed from circulation within 18 months of issuing the polymer $20 banknotes. By November 2013, about 700 million banknotes of the $20, $50, and $100 denominations had been released into circulation. The Bank of Canada printed 580 million polymer banknotes in 2012 and 675 million in 2013. The operating costs for the 2013 second-quarter of the Bank of Canada increased 23% from the previous year, nearly half of which was a result of printing the polymer banknotes.

During the introduction of the $5 and $10 banknotes, a spokesman for the Royal Canadian Mounted Police stated that counterfeiting of the polymer $20, $50 and $100 banknotes that had been previously released was dramatically lower than that of previous series. By late 2013, the counterfeit ratio had been reduced to below 40 PPM, and about 5% of retailers still refused to accept $100 banknotes for payment.

The Bank of Canada expected the 2011 Frontier series to last about eight years. It issued polymer banknotes into circulation in exchange for paper banknotes of earlier series which were then removed from circulation. Because of the increased lifespan of the Frontier banknotes compared to earlier banknote series, the Bank of Canada expected to replace smaller volumes of worn and damaged banknotes than it did in previous years. When removed from circulation, the polymer banknotes are recycled instead of being destroyed like the paper-based banknotes of previous series. By early November 2012, at least 315 banknotes had to be replaced because of damage. As a result of decreased demand for banknote printing services, BA International closed its Ottawa printing operation in 2012 and sold it to Canadian Bank Note Company for $10.2 million in 2013.

In March 2012, the Canadian National Institute for the Blind issued a press release lauding the "touch, sight and electronic signal features" of the polymer banknotes. The Bank of Canada patented a machine-readable feature created by its researchers during development of the Frontier series. It was first used in the Frontier series and adapted for commercial production by one of the development partners.

The communications and information company MacDonald, Dettwiler and Associates, which developed the robotic systems deployed to space by the Canadian Space Agency which appear on the $5 banknote, sent some members of the media a promotional package containing a $5 banknote and a letter in January 2014. The letter stated that the release of the banknotes afforded the company "a unique opportunity to highlight Canada's tremendous accomplishments in space" as well as the company's role in a "very cost-effective way".

The Bank of Canada commissioned a life-cycle assessment of the 2001 Canadian Journey and 2011 Frontier series banknotes to evaluate the environmental impact of the life cycle of each banknote.

After officials at the Bank of England confirmed reports that the polymer £5 note issued in September 2016 contained traces of tallow, a rendered animal fat derived from suet, Bank of Canada officials stated that additives in the polymer pellets used for producing banknotes in the Frontier series contained trace quantities of tallow.
