= Vertical (banknotes) =

2018 Canadian banknote series

The eighth series of banknotes of the Canadian dollar was first released by the Bank of Canada in 2018. Like the preceding 2011 Frontier series, the 2018 series consists of polymer banknotes designed for increased durability and to incorporate more security features. It is the first series issued by the Bank of Canada printed in a vertical configuration.

The banknotes were designed by the Canadian Bank Note Company, which also prints the banknotes. The first note, the $10 bill featuring Viola Desmond, was revealed on International Women's Day, 8 March 2018, and was released to the public on 19 November 2018. Future notes will come at a slower pace than previous series to allow technological innovations to be worked into their design as time goes on.

The $10 note is the first Canadian banknote in history to possess a vertical orientation; future banknotes of other denominations (such as the $5, $20 and $50 notes) are expected to share the similar vertical orientation.

== $5 note ==
In January 2020, the Bank of Canada confirmed it would begin soliciting suggestions for the historic Canadian who would replace Wilfrid Laurier on the $5 note. The Bank of Canada released a shortlist of candidates under consideration for the bill in November 2020 which included figures such as Pitseolak Ashoona, Won Alexander Cumyow, Terry Fox, Robertine Barry, Francis Pegahmagabow, Lotta Hitschmanova, Crowfoot, Fred Loft and others. In accordance with the Bank of Canada Act, the Minister of Finance will make the final decision and the name of the individual selected will be announced thereforth. Once the new portrait subject has been selected, the banknote design process would be initiated and the polymer note will possess a vertical design. In 2020, the Bank of Canada stated that the new $5 note would be in circulation within a few years; however, in a 2024 update, it was announced that, because the redesign of the $20 note to replace Elizabeth II's portrait with that of Charles III was underway, work on redesigning the $5 note had been halted. On 16 December 2024, it was revealed that Terry Fox had been selected to appear on the $5 note.

== $10 note ==
The obverse and reverse of the $10 banknote

The $10 note is purple, and the obverse features a portrait of Viola Desmond, a Black Nova Scotian businesswoman who challenged racial segregation at a film theatre in New Glasgow, Nova Scotia, in 1946. The background of the portrait is a colourful rendition of the street grid of Halifax, Nova Scotia, including the waterfront, Citadel, and Gottingen Street, where Desmond's Studio of Beauty Culture was located. Foil features on the note face include both the flag and Coat of Arms of Canada. This is the first Canadian banknote to feature neither a Canadian prime minister nor a member of the Canadian royal family in its solo portrait.

The reverse features the Canadian Museum for Human Rights in Winnipeg, Manitoba. Part of the background pattern mirrors the museum's interior architecture and its ramps connecting multiple levels. A foil eagle feather is prominent, symbolizing ideals such as truth, power, and freedom. A quotation from section 15 of the Canadian Charter of Rights and Freedoms appears in both English and French.

The foil window at the base of the note includes an iridescent rendering of the Library of Parliament's vaulted dome ceiling, which can be seen from both sides of the note.

In 2019, the International Bank Note Society awarded the design the top prize in its annual banknote design competition. It won against new currency designs from Switzerland, Norway, Russia, and Solomon Islands.

== $20 note ==
The obverse and reverse of the $20 banknote

After the accession of Charles III to the throne following the death of Elizabeth II in 2022, the Government of Canada announced that a portrait of Charles would appear on the new $20 banknote. In 2024, a Bank of Canada spokesperson said the bank had begun the design process of the $20 note, and that it should be issued in a few years. In a further statement, the Bank of Canada released additional details of the upcoming $20 note, confirming that it would be made of polymer, have a vertical orientation, be primarily green in colour, feature Charles III on the front and the Canadian National Vimy Memorial on the back, and would also contain enhanced security features. The bank unveiled the design on 3 September 2026, with the note scheduled to enter circulation in late February 2027.

== $50 note ==
On 16 December 2024 it was announced that Wilfrid Laurier will appear on the next $50 note, replacing William Lyon Mackenzie King.
