= Bank of Canada Museum =

Museum in Ottawa, Ontario, Canada

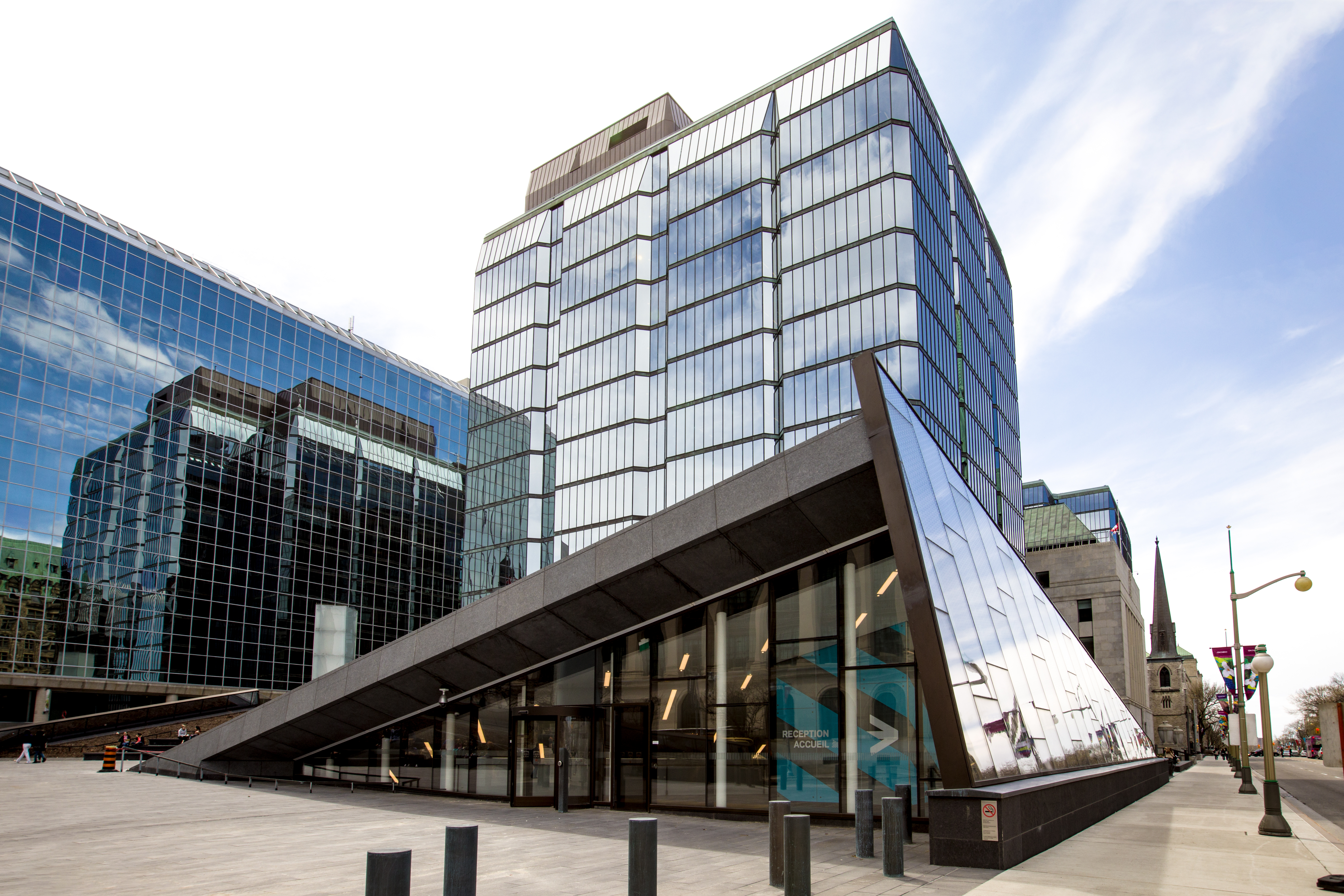
- The new location of the Bank of Canada Museum
- Established: 1980
- Location: Ottawa, Ontario, Canada
- Coordinates: 45.42088°N 75.702968°W
- Website: Bank of Canada Museum

The Bank of Canada Museum (French: Musée de la Banque du Canada; since July 2017), formerly known as the Currency Museum (Musée de la monnaie).

The Bank of Canada Museum is a cultural attraction located in downtown Ottawa, Canada's capital city. It is a part of Canada's central bank, mandated to educate Canadians about what the Bank of Canada does, how the economy works and the history of money.

The Museum is part of the Bank of Canada's head office complex, built beneath the Bank of Canada's plaza on the corner of Bank and Wellington Streets near the Canadian Parliament Buildings. It is an interactive museum, one with many gamified hands-on exhibits designed to promote the concept that "you are the economy."

It is home to exhibits showing over 1,000 examples of Canadian and world currency, plus related items. The Museum's collection, the National Currency Collection, holds the most complete collection of Canadian coins, bank notes and tokens.

The Museum provides many onsite and online educational resources on financial literacy, economics and the work of the Bank of Canada for students of all ages.

It is Canada's only free national museum.

== History ==
The Bank of Canada Museum began life as the Currency Museum of the Bank of Canada. It opened in 1980 on the ground floor of the Bank of Canada building in Ottawa, Ontario. It was primarily an exhibition space for the National Currency Collection.

=== National Currency Collection ===
The creation of a national currency collection was first proposed in the late 1950s by Bank Governor James Coyne. Numismatic consultant G.R.L. Potter was hired in 1959 to help develop the collection. Under his guidance the Bank began collecting artifacts that depicted the development of Canadian currency over the previous 150 years.

By 1962 Sheldon S. Carroll had been hired as the Bank's first Curator. Governor Louis Rasminsky directed Carroll to develop as complete as possible a collection of Canadian coins, tokens and paper money. Carroll also established collections of ancient, medieval and modern foreign currency, and of artifacts related to banking and monetary matters. The core of the Collection was assembled during this period.

Artifacts were acquired from individual collectors, private-sector firms and public agencies. The collection of J. Douglas Ferguson, perhaps the best-known Canadian numismatist of his time, was purchased in 1963. This acquisition included paper money issued during the French regime, and a selection of ancient, medieval and contemporary coins.

Another significant acquisition came in 1965 with the transfer of a large collection of coins from the Public Archives of Canada—now Library and Archives Canada. These included the Hart Collection, which had been purchased by the Canadian government in 1883.

In 1974 the Bank purchased a large collection from the Château de Ramezay, home of the Numismatic and Antiquarian Society of Montréal, Canada's first numismatic society. This acquisition included the collection of R.W. McLachlan, Canada's leading numismatist of the late 19th and early 20th centuries. In 1977, the Canadian Secretary of State formally designated the Bank's acquisitions as the National Currency Collection. Today the collection includes coins, banknotes, dies, plates, and engraving tools, bank and government ledgers, weights and scales, cash registers, wallets, numismatic medals and cards and examples of counterfeit money.

=== Currency Museum ===
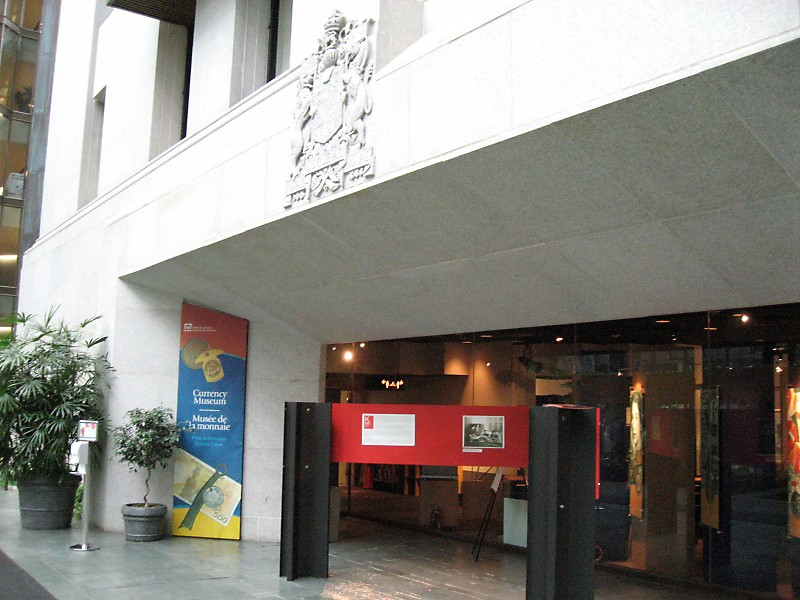
Currency Museum in 2009

The original museum, the Currency Museum of the Bank of Canada, opened its doors to the public in the newly expanded, Arthur Erickson-designed Bank of Canada head office complex on December 5, 1980. It displayed some 9,000 currency items and related artifacts from around the world. It was located in the former Banker's Hall on the main floor of the original 1938 Bank of Canada Building. Access was through the Garden Court in the artrium. At this time the atrium was open to the public. It is no longer publicly accessible.

The Currency Museum, apart from temporary exhibitions, remained unchanged until 2013. On July 2, the museum was closed for four years, while the Bank of Canada building was renovated. Plans by then were already underway for a new museum with a new mandate, scheduled to open in 2017. It opened that July 1st.

=== New Bank of Canada Museum ===
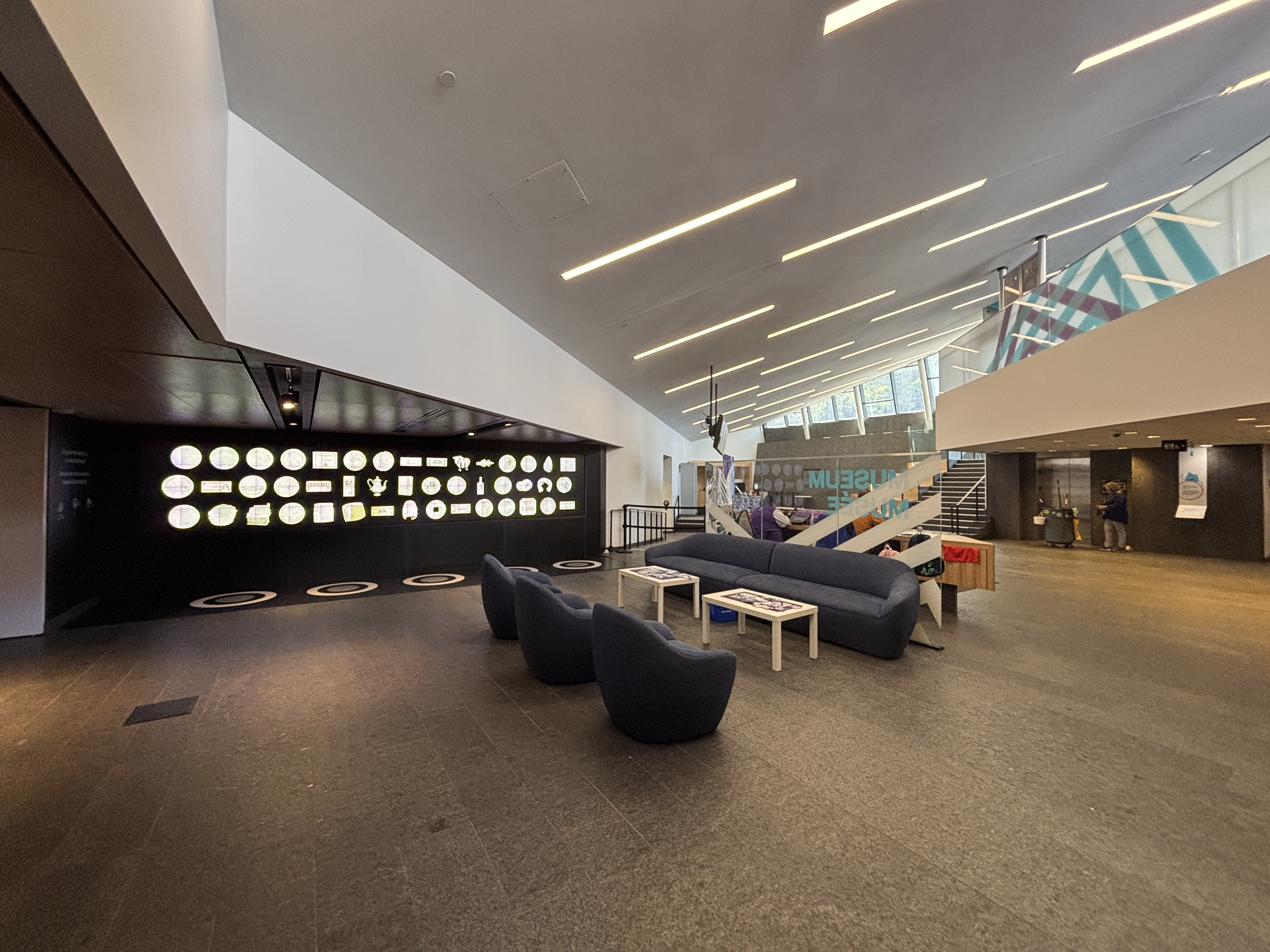
Reception

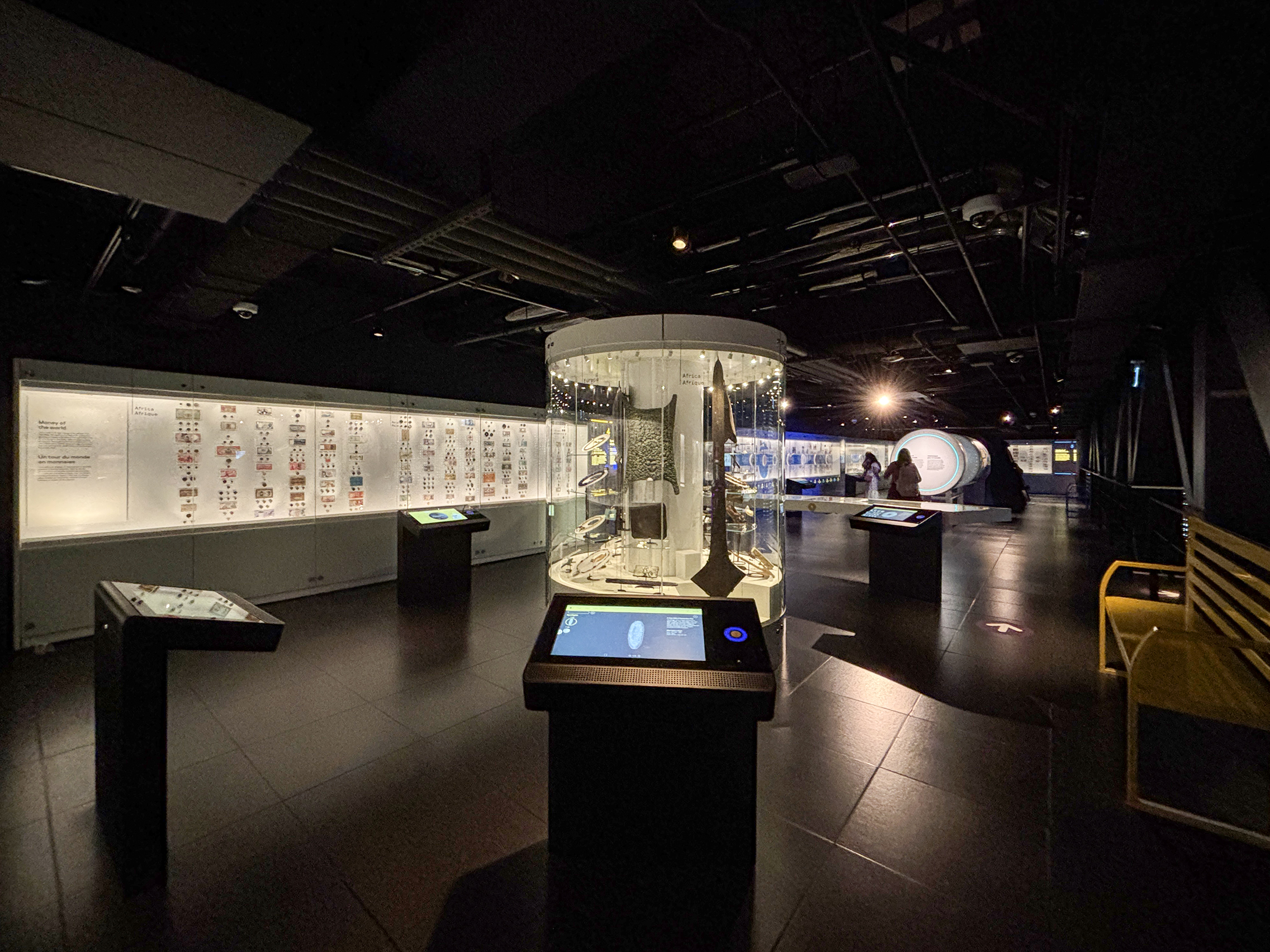
Interior of the museum

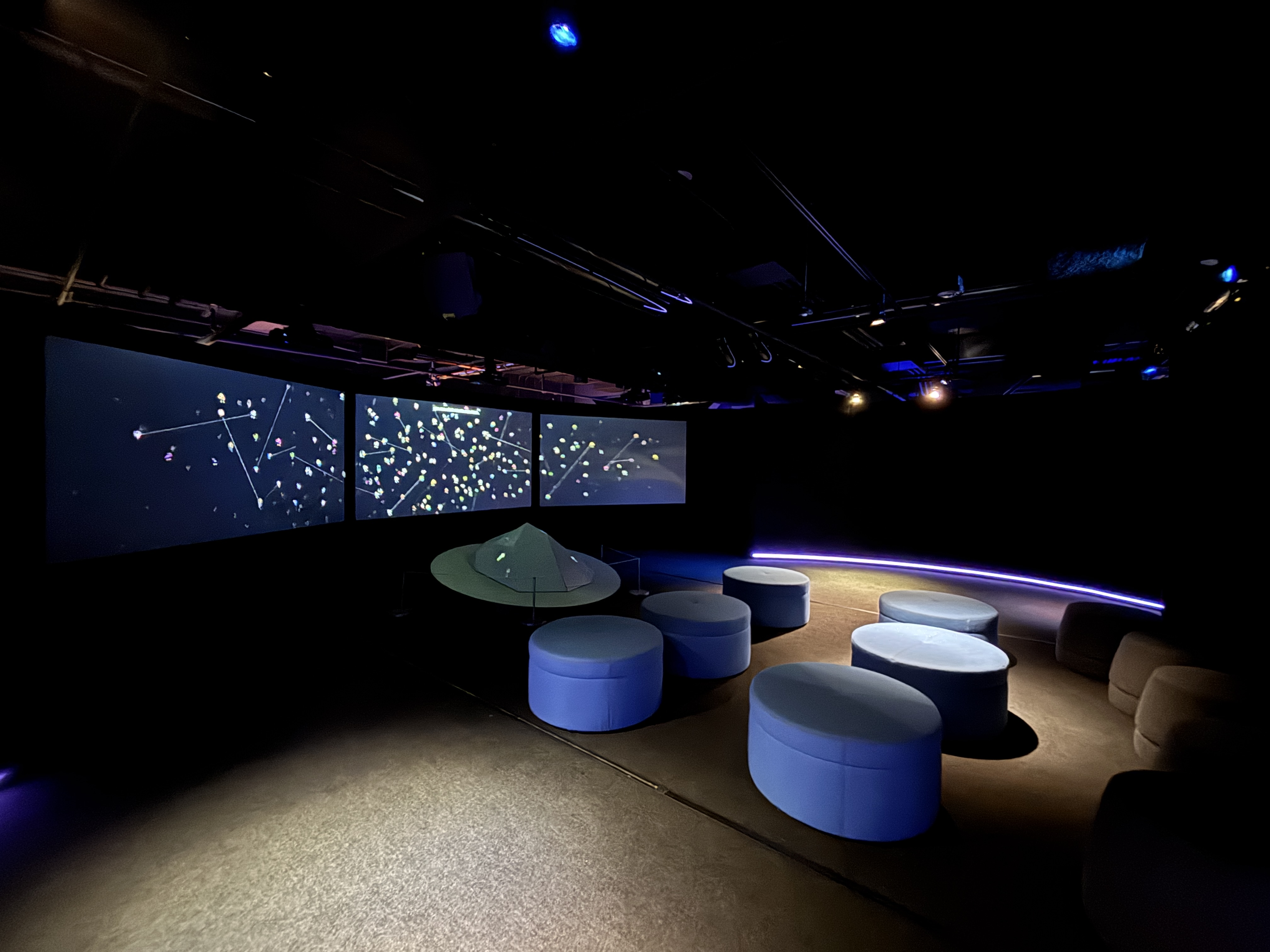
Theatre

The Bank of Canada Museum consists of many exhibits in 7 zones. They are aimed at both children, and adults. To view most exhibits and artifacts, visitors are encouraged create a virtual avatar, a fun cartoon character which they customize using touch screens in the lobby. Visitors will receive a wristband which will connect to the interactive exhibits and digitized artifact monitors. Visitors' avatars will follow them through the museum, popping up on interactive screens throughout. An example of an interactive exhibit is the 2% Rocket. Visitors sit in a cockpit and fly a ship along a twisting route through space, maintaining their highest speed to hit a target of 2%—that's the Bank's target for an ideal inflation rate. Visitors can also create their own "currency", with a design-your-own bank note interactive.

Part of the Museum's task is to also educate the public on the history of money. The display casescontain~~s~~ hundreds of examples of currency~~.~~ Although the collection is focussed on Canadian currency it has bank notes, coins and trade items from around the world and from over thousands of years of history.

Temporary exhibits are usually presented every few years. Previous exhibitions include "A Noteworthy Woman" (2018) about Viola Desmond, the Canadian human rights icon seen on the Vertical Series $10 bill, "Luck and Lore" (2019), an exhibition about the myths and legends surrounding money and luck and "Money in 10 Questions: Kids Edition" (2023), a highly interactive exhibition designed to help children become more financially literate.

Another part of the Museum's mandate is education. It has created more than 40 lesson plans, activities, video guides, and onsite and virtual school programs. Its expanding online resources have been created to assist elementary and high school teachers to fulfill their economic curriculum obligations. As well, a continually growing collection of over 200 blogs is available on the Museum's website appealing to educators, special interest groups and the general public alike. In 2022, the Museum introduced its Award for Excellence in Teaching Economics, a program celebrating outstanding work in financial literacy among Canadian teachers.

In 2024, the Museum welcomed over 68,000 visitors and reached over 8,400 students through its educational programming.
