= Flags of the lieutenant governors of Canada =

As the viceregal representative of the monarch of Canada, the lieutenant governors of the Canadian provinces have since Confederation been entitled to and have used a personal standard. Within a lieutenant governor's province, this standard has precedence over any other flag, including the national one, though it comes secondary to the Sovereign's Flag for Canada. The provincial viceregal flags are also subordinate to the governor general's personal standard, save for when the governor general is present as a guest of the lieutenant governor.

In 1980, a new design was introduced and is used by each province's lieutenant governor, except for Quebec. Common frame of each flag consists of the escutcheon of the arms of the province circled with ten gold maple leaves (representing the ten provinces) surmounted by a St. Edward's Crown on a field of blue. Though approved in 1980, most provinces adopted this new common design in 1981, with Nova Scotia being the last in 2024. The flags of the lieutenant governors of Quebec and of Nova Scotia use a Tudor Crown. The personal standard is flown at the office or home of the lieutenant governor and from flagpoles of buildings where official duties are carried out to indicate presence of the lieutenant governor. It is also attached to the front fender of the car or on the provincial landau that the lieutenant governor is riding in. The standard is never flown on a church or inside a church, nor is it ever lowered to half-mast. Should a lieutenant governor die while in office, the standard is taken down until a successor is sworn in.

== Current ==
Flag	Lieutenant governor	Description
	Ontario (2026–present)	The escutcheon of Arms of Ontario, crowned, on a blue field, surrounded by ten golden maple leaves.
	Quebec (1952–present)	The Coat of Arms of Quebec, crowned, within a white disc on a blue field.
	Nova Scotia (2024–present)	The escutcheon of Arms of Nova Scotia, crowned, on a blue field, surrounded by ten golden maple leaves.
	New Brunswick (1982–present)	The escutcheon of Arms of New Brunswick, crowned, on a blue field, surrounded by ten golden maple leaves.
	Manitoba (1984–present)	The escutcheon of Arms of Manitoba, crowned, on a blue field, surrounded by ten golden maple leaves.
	British Columbia (1982–present)	The escutcheon of Arms of British Columbia, crowned, on a blue field, surrounded by ten golden maple leaves
	Prince Edward Island (2026–present)	The escutcheon of Arms of Prince Edward Island, crowned, on a blue field, surrounded by ten golden maple leaves
	Saskatchewan (2026–present)	The escutcheon of Arms of Saskatchewan, crowned, on a blue field, surrounded by ten golden maple leaves.
	Alberta (1981–present)	The escutcheon of Arms of Alberta, crowned on a blue field, surrounded by ten golden maple leaves.
	Newfoundland and Labrador (1987–present)	The escutcheon of Arms of Newfoundland and Labrador, crowned, on a blue field, surrounded by ten golden maple leaves.
Flag	Commissioner	Description
	Northwest Territories (2006–present)	The escutcheon of Arms of the Northwest Territories, on a blue field, surrounded by six golden maple leaves and two mountain avens flowers, and a pair of addorsed narwhals.
	Yukon (2007–present)	The escutcheon of Arms of Yukon, on a blue field, surrounded by six golden maple leaves, two fireweed flowers, and an Alaskan Malamute dog.
	Nunavut (2009–present)	The escutcheon of Arms of Nunavut, crowned, on a blue field, surrounded by six golden maple leaves, two purple saxifrage flowers, and an igloo.

== Historical ==
Flag	Lieutenant governor	Description
	Alberta (1907–1981)	The Union Jack defaced in the centre with a white circle containing the arms of Alberta and surrounded by a wreath of maple leaves.
	British Columbia (1871–1906)	The Union Jack defaced in the centre with a white circle containing a crown surmounted by a lion with the letters "B" and "C" either side of it and surrounded by a wreath of maple leaves.
	British Columbia (1906–1982)	The Union Jack defaced in the centre with a white circle containing the arms and motto of British Columbia and surrounded by a wreath of maple leaves. (In this example, the motto is misspelled. It should say "splendor sine occasu" rather than "splendor sine ocassu")
	Manitoba (1870–1905)	The Union Jack defaced in the centre with a white circle containing the unofficial 1870 arms of Manitoba and surrounded by a wreath of maple leaves.
	Manitoba (1905–1984)	The Union Jack defaced in the centre with a white circle containing the arms of Manitoba and surrounded by a wreath of maple leaves.
	New Brunswick (1870–1982)	The Union Jack defaced in the centre with a white circle containing the arms of New Brunswick and surrounded by a wreath of maple leaves.
	Newfoundland (Note: This flag was first flown in 1904 when Newfoundland was still a Colony and later Dominion of the British Empire.) (1949–1975)	The Union Jack defaced in the centre with the badge of Newfoundland surrounded by a laurel wreath.
	Newfoundland (1975–1987)	The Union Jack defaced in the centre with the badge of Newfoundland surrounded by a wreath of maple leaves.
	Nova Scotia (1870–1929)	The Union Jack defaced in the centre with a white circle containing the 1868 arms of Nova Scotia and surrounded by a wreath of maple leaves.
	Nova Scotia (1929–2024)	The Union Jack defaced in the centre with a white circle containing the arms of Nova Scotia and surrounded by a wreath of maple leaves.
	Ontario (1870–1959) (1965–1981)	The Union Jack defaced in the centre with a white circle containing the arms of Ontario and surrounded by a wreath of maple leaves.
	Ontario (1959–1965)	The Canadian Red Ensign defaced in the lower fly by a white disk bearing the shield of the arms of Ontario surrounded by a wreath of green maple leaves.
	Ontario (1981–2026)	The escutcheon of Arms of Ontario, crowned, on a blue field, surrounded by ten golden maple leaves.
	Prince Edward Island (1878–1905)	The Union Jack defaced in the centre with the badge of Prince Edward Island surrounded by a wreath of maple leaves.
	Prince Edward Island (1905–1981)	The Union Jack defaced in the centre with a white circle containing the arms and motto of Prince Edward Island and surrounded by a wreath of maple leaves.
	Prince Edward Island (1981–2026)	The escutcheon of Arms of Prince Edward Island, crowned, on a blue field, surrounded by ten golden maple leaves.
	Quebec (1870–1939)	The Union Jack defaced in the centre with a white circle containing the 1868 arms of Quebec and surrounded by a wreath of maple leaves.
	Quebec (1939–1952)	The Union Jack defaced in the centre with a white circle containing the arms of Quebec and surrounded by a wreath of maple leaves.
	Saskatchewan (1906–1981)	The Union Jack defaced in the centre with a white circle containing the arms of Saskatchewan and surrounded by a wreath of maple leaves.
	Saskatchewan (1981–2026)	The escutcheon of Arms of Saskatchewan, crowned, on a blue field, surrounded by ten golden maple leaves.

For the other provinces many of them used a defaced Union Jack with the vice-regal arms in the centre.

== See also ==
- Flag of the governor general of Canada
- List of Canadian flags
- Royal standards of Canada
