= Alexander Scott Carter =

Canadian artist and architect (1881–1968)

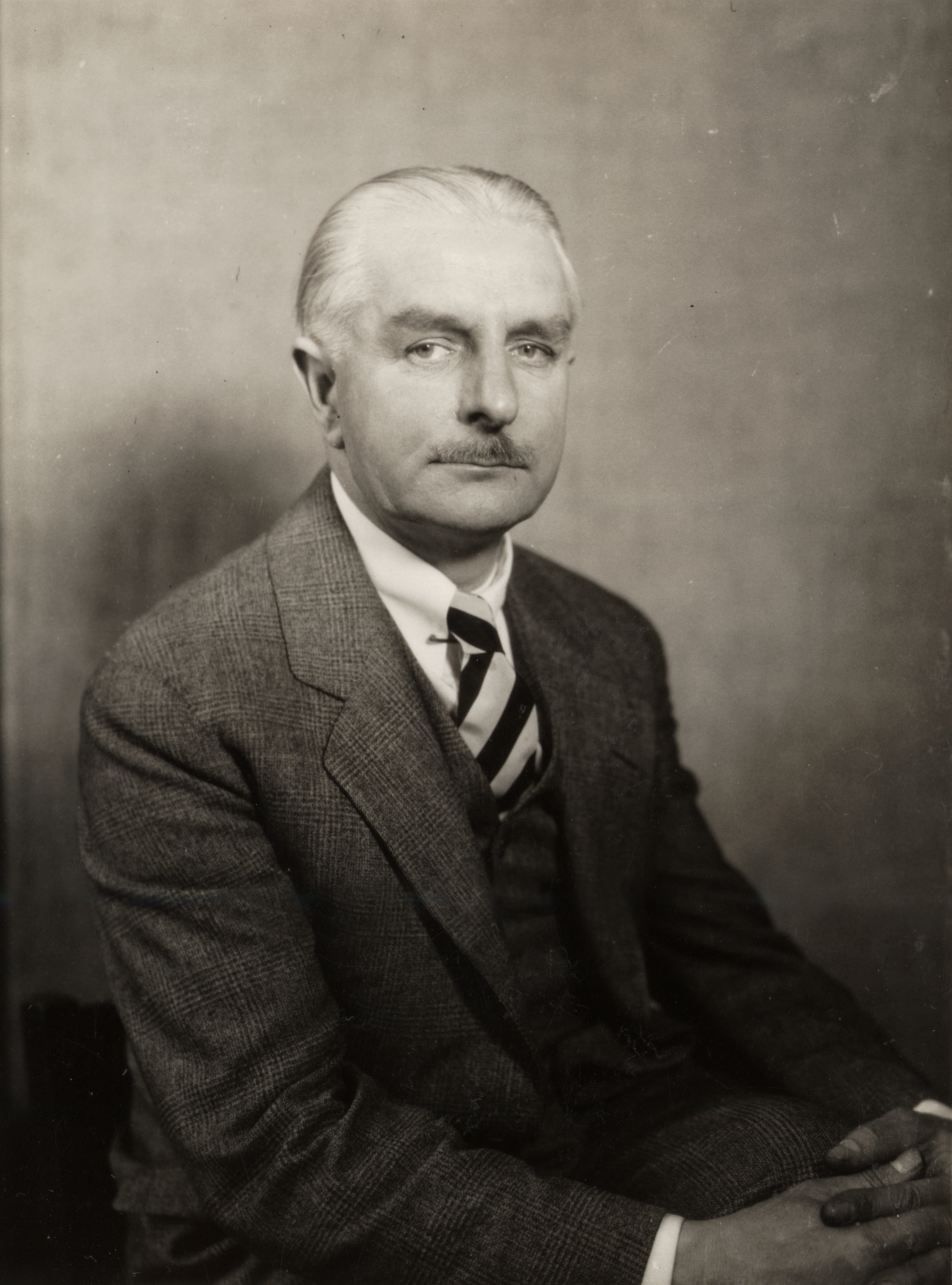
Carter, c. 1930.

Alexander Scott Carter (7 April 1881 – 30 December 1968) was an English-born Canadian artist and architect, specializing in architectural decoration and heraldic ornament.

== Early life and education ==
Carter was born on 7 April 1881 in Harrow, Middlesex.

He attended the Bournemouth School of Art. He articled with J. S. C. McEwan-Brown, an architect local to Bournemouth. In 1902, he moved to London and was employed in the offices of architects William Hunt and later Alan G. James. From 1905 to 1908, he attended the Royal Academy of Arts, where his instructors included Sir Thomas Graham Jackson, Sir Reginald Blomfield and Sir Aston Webb. He was awarded two silver medals for his designs at school.

== Career ==
Carter was elected a licentiate of the Royal Institute of British Architects in March 1911. He emigrated to Canada in 1912, settling in Toronto.

In Toronto, he came under the patronage of Henry Sproatt. Sproatt utilized Carter's artistic talents in the decoration of the Great Hall of Hart House at the University of Toronto. For this project, Carter created heraldic shields of universities from around the world.

In 1920, Dominion Archivist Arthur Doughty commissioned Scott to design a proposal for the royal arms of Canada. Doughty sat on a committee formed the year before to select select distinct national arms. Carter's designed, which featured red leaves on a white background, was ultimately rejected in favour of a design with green leaves. The arms were later updated in 1957 to change the colour of the leaves to red, fulfilling Carter's vision. Red and white were confirmed as Canada's national colours when the present flag of Canada was adopted in 1965.

Carter had a prolific working relationship with the Anglican Diocese of Toronto. In 1927, he designed at chalice, memorial book and plaques for St. Michael and All Angels, Wychwood, and that same year he decorated at the Lady Chapel at St. Thomas's, Huron Street. He designed the reredoses above the high altars at St. Thomas's in 1940–1941, and Grace Church on-the-Hill in 1948. He further created heraldic plaques, including the royal arms of Queen Victoria, for the decoration of Trinity College, an Anglican institution.

He was elected an associate of the Royal Canadian Academy of Arts in 1922, going on to become a full academician in 1927, and later a senior academician in 1957. He held further memberships in the Ontario Association of Architects and the Royal Architectural Institute of Canada. Carter moved back to England in 1960, eventually returning to Canada and dying in Toronto on 30 December 1968, aged 87.

== Gallery of works ==
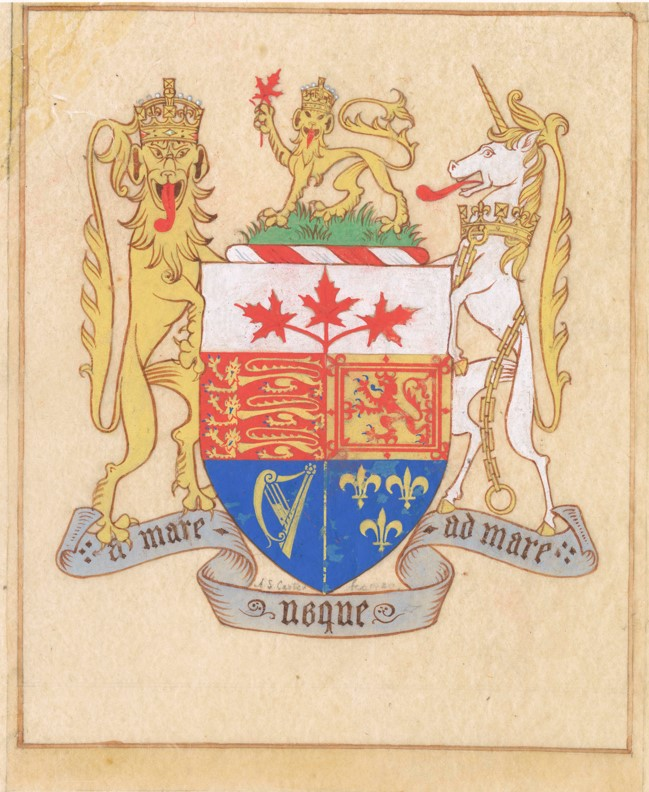
Carter's proposal for the royal arms of Canada, 1920.

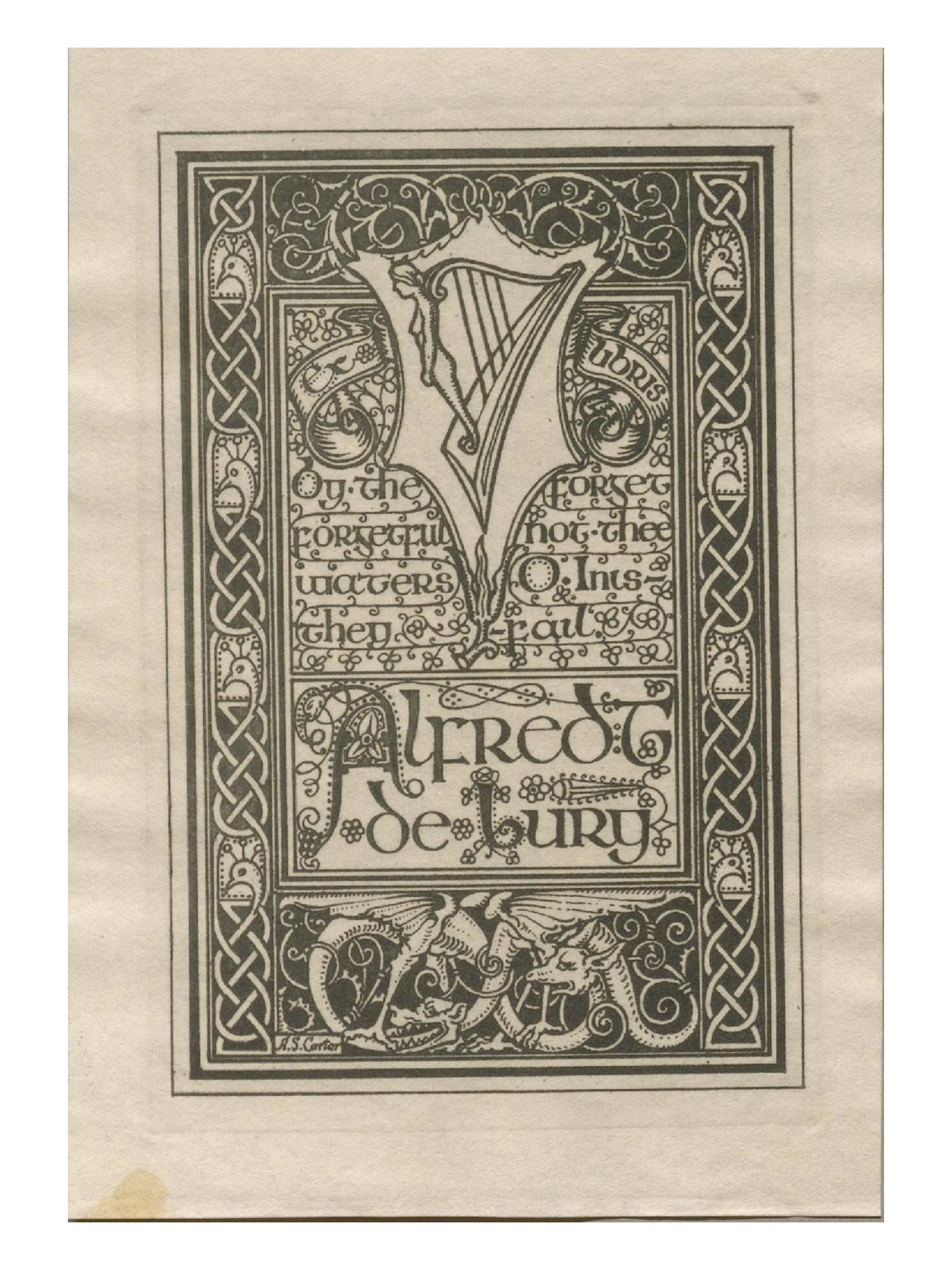
Bookplate designed by Carter for Alfred de Lury.

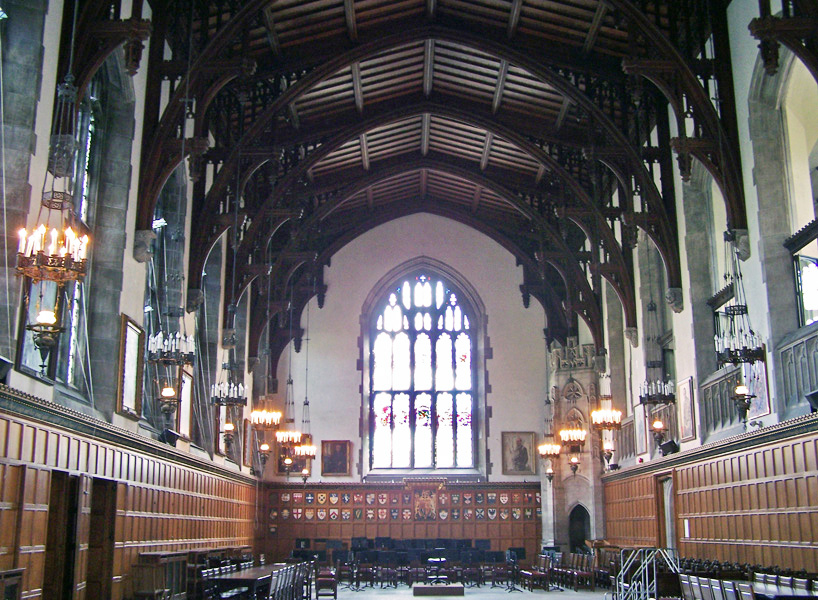
Great Hall of Hart House with coats of arms of universities around the world by Carter, 1926.

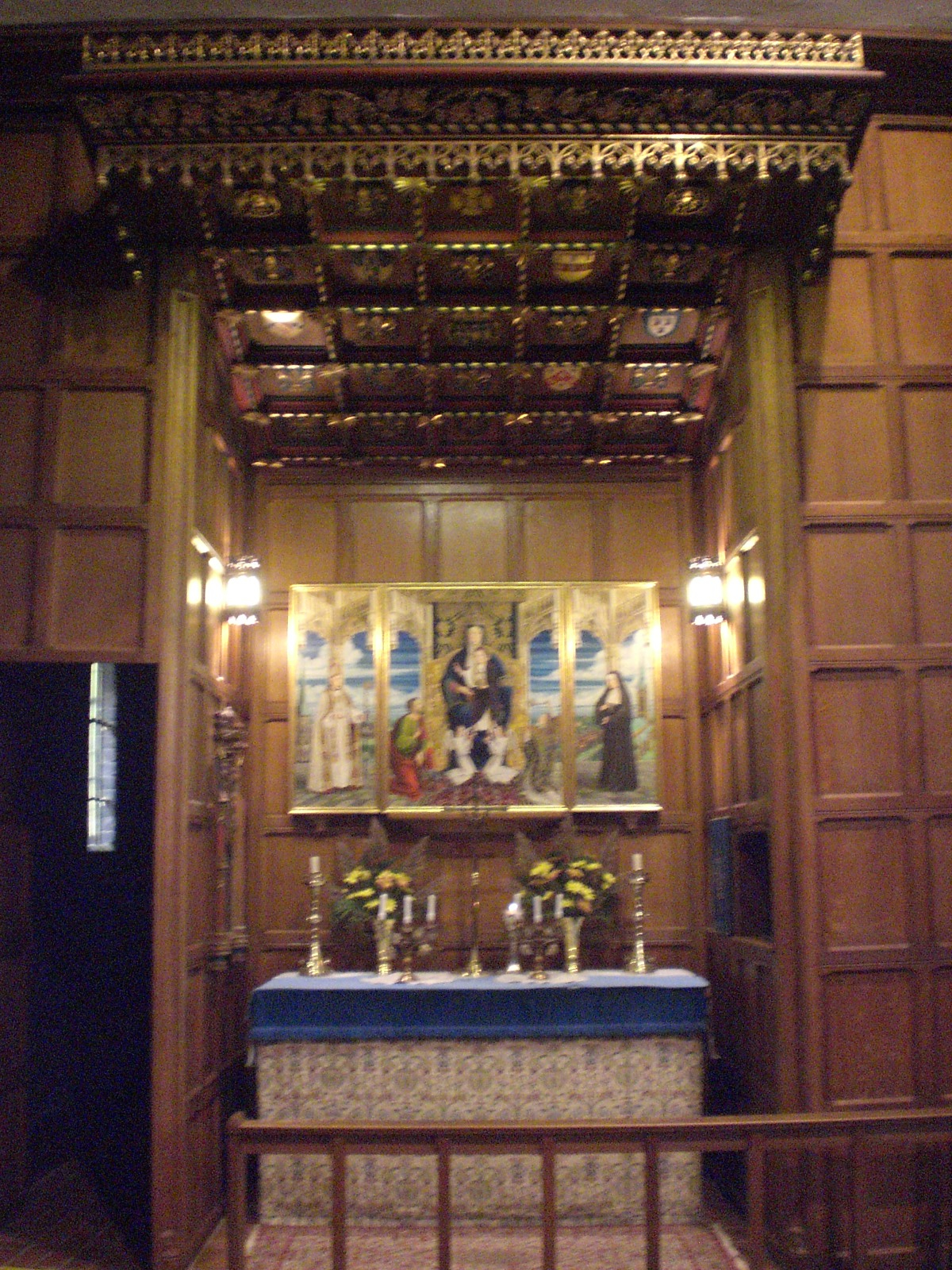
Lady Chapel at St. Thomas's, Huron Street, 1927.

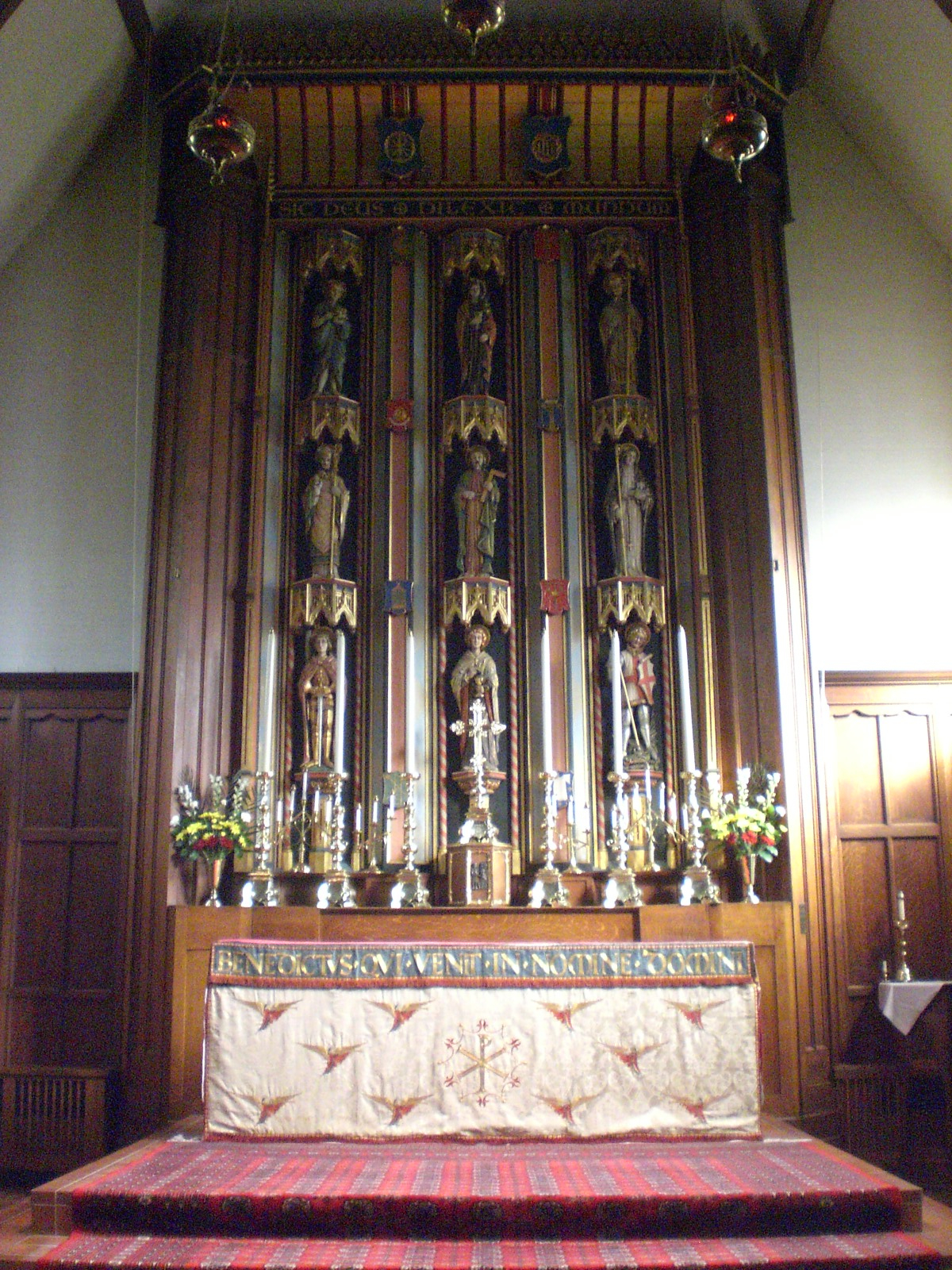
Reredos above the high altar at St. Thomas's, Huron Street, 1940–1941.

Seal of the Toronto Police Service with the coat of arms Carter designed for the now dissolved Municipality of Metropolitan Toronto in 1953.
