= Coat of arms of Canada =

Arms of His Majesty The King in Right of Canada Armoiries de Sa Majesté le Roi du Canada
- Official rendition used by the Canadian state
- Armiger: Charles III, King of Canada
- Adopted: Approved by order in council on 21 April 1921, and by royal proclamation on 21 November 1921. last revised 12 July 1994.
- Crest: Upon a royal helmet, a lion passant guardant or imperially crowned proper and holding in the dexter paw a maple leaf gules.
- Torse: Argent and gules, the mantling gules doubled argent.
- Shield: Tierced in fess, the first and second divisions containing the quarterly coat following, namely, 1st gules three lions passant guardant in pale or, 2nd, or a lion rampant within a double tressure flory-counter-flory gules, 3rd, azure a harp or stringed argent, 4th, azure three fleurs-de-lis or, and the third division being argent three maple leaves conjoined on one stem proper.
- Supporters: Dexter: a lion or holding a lance argent, point or, flying therefrom to the dexter the Royal Union Flag, sinister: a unicorn argent armed, crined and unguled or, gorged with a coronet composed of crosses-patée and fleurs-de-lis a chain affixed thereto and reflexed or, holding a like lance flying therefrom to the sinister a banner azure charged with three fleurs-de-lis or.
- Compartment: A wreath of roses, thistles, shamrocks, and lilies proper.
- Motto: A Mari usque ad Mare (Latin for 'from sea to sea')
- Order: The ribbon of the Order of Canada (Desiderantes meliorem patriam (Latin for 'desiring a better country'))
- Other elements: The whole ensigned by the royal crown proper.
- Earlier version: Arms of Canada, revised 1957

The coat of arms of Canada, (Note: French: Armoiries du Canada) also known as the Royal Coat of Arms of Canada (Note: French: armoiries royales du Canada) or, formally, as the Arms of His Majesty The King in Right of Canada, (Note: French: Armoiries de Sa Majesté le Roi du Canada) is the arms of dominion of the Canadian monarch and, thus, also the official coat of arms of Canada. In use since 1921, it is closely modelled after the royal coat of arms of the United Kingdom, with French and distinctive Canadian elements replacing or added to those derived from the British version.

The maple leaves in the shield, blazoned "proper" (i.e., in natural colour), were originally drawn vert (green), but were redrawn gules (red) in 1957 and a circlet of the Order of Canada was added to the arms for limited use in 1987. The arms are registered with the Canadian Heraldic Authority and protected under Crown copyright; they are used to signify national sovereignty and the federal government uses the arms to represent the state under the Federal Identity Program. Elements of the coat of arms are also used in other designs, with the shield being used in the various royal standards belonging to members of the royal family and the crest of the arms serving as the focal point of the governor general's flag.

== History ==
Prior to Confederation in 1867, the royal coat of arms of the United Kingdom served in Canada as the symbol of royal authority. Arms had not been granted to any of the colonies in British North America, apart from 17th century grants to Nova Scotia and Newfoundland. Arms were then granted by royal warrant, on 26 May 1868, to Ontario, Quebec, Nova Scotia, and New Brunswick. (That Nova Scotia had previously been granted arms was forgotten and it took until 1929 for the historic arms granted in the 17th century to be reinstated.) In that warrant, Queen Victoria authorized the four arms of the first provinces to be quartered for use on the Great Seal of Canada. While this was not done for the first Great Seal, it was through that reference that the arrangement became the de facto arms for Canada until 1921, which were used on the first Red Ensign carried by Canadian troops at Vimy Ridge in 1917.

As more provinces and territories joined Canada, the original four arms were marshalled with the arms of the new members of Confederation, eventually resulting in a shield with nine quarterings. This occurred by way of popular and even Canadian governmental usage; flag-makers took to using the complex shield on Canadian Red Ensigns. None of those shields, besides the original four-segment version of 1868, were ever official in any sense, nor were any of these shields a national "coat of arms", as they had never been approved by the monarch.

Heraldists considered nine quarterings on a shield as too convoluted for a national symbol and, by 1915, a push had begun to design a new coat of arms for Canada. A committee, which included Dominion Archivist Arthur Doughty, was formed in 1919 to pursue the issue, eventually agreeing that the elements of the new arms would reference the royal arms of England, Ireland, Scotland, and France, with maple leaves representing Canada, though there was at the time no consensus on how the leaves were to be used. A 1917 proposal by Edward Marion Chadwick (who had designed the crest, supporters, and motto of the coat of arms of Ontario) sparked a discussion about featuring First Nations figures as supporters. Though Chadwick had depicted the clothing and regalia accurately, Joseph Pope rejected the idea, stating, "I myself do not see any necessity for commemorating the Indians at all."

The Royal Banner of France from 1589 to 1792, with the three fleurs-de-lis replicated on the Canadian coat of arms

The arms' design was settled by the following year and the committee conferred with the College of Arms in London, only to face resistance to the use of the UK's royal arms from the Garter King of Arms, as well as concern over whether the inclusion of the fleurs-de-lis would imply Canada claimed sovereignty over France. The Canadian Commissioner-General in Paris discreetly confirmed with French officials that the coat of arms would not spark a diplomatic spat. A counter-proposal from the college added the flags to the supporters and a crown to the lion, as in the British arms, and placed the three fleurs-de-lis between two green maple leaves in the fifth charge on the shield, below the four charges of the arms of the UK.

After some manoeuvring, including the personal intervention of Winston Churchill, the new arms of Canada were eventually formally requested by an order-in-council on 21 April 1921 and adopted on 21 November of the same year, by proclamation of King George V, as the Arms or Ensigns Armorial of the Dominion of Canada;. the committee records were preserved with Library and Archives Canada. The new layout closely reflected the arms of the United Kingdom, with the addition of maple leaves in the base and the reference to the French royal arms in the fourth quarter.

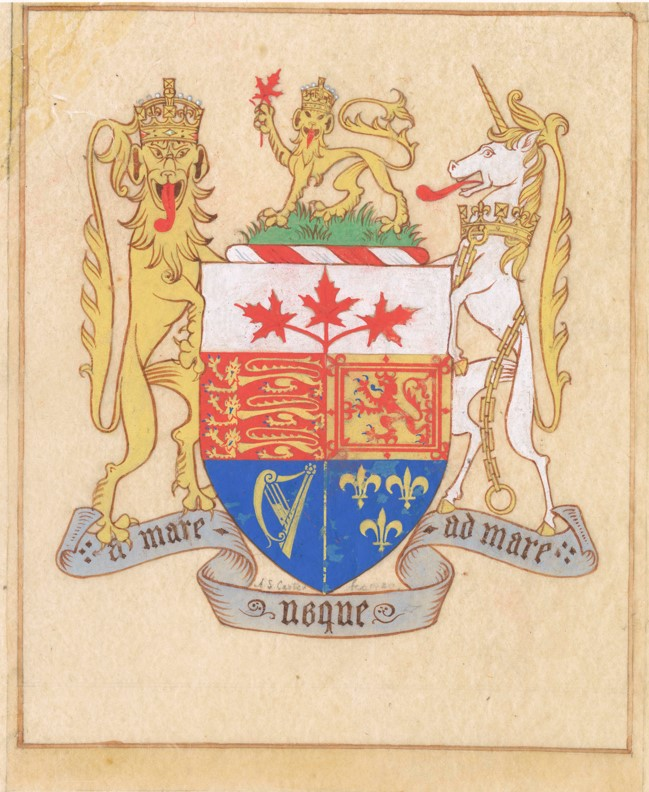
A draft of the royal arms of Canada by Canadian heraldic artist Alexander Scott Carter, drawn in 1920

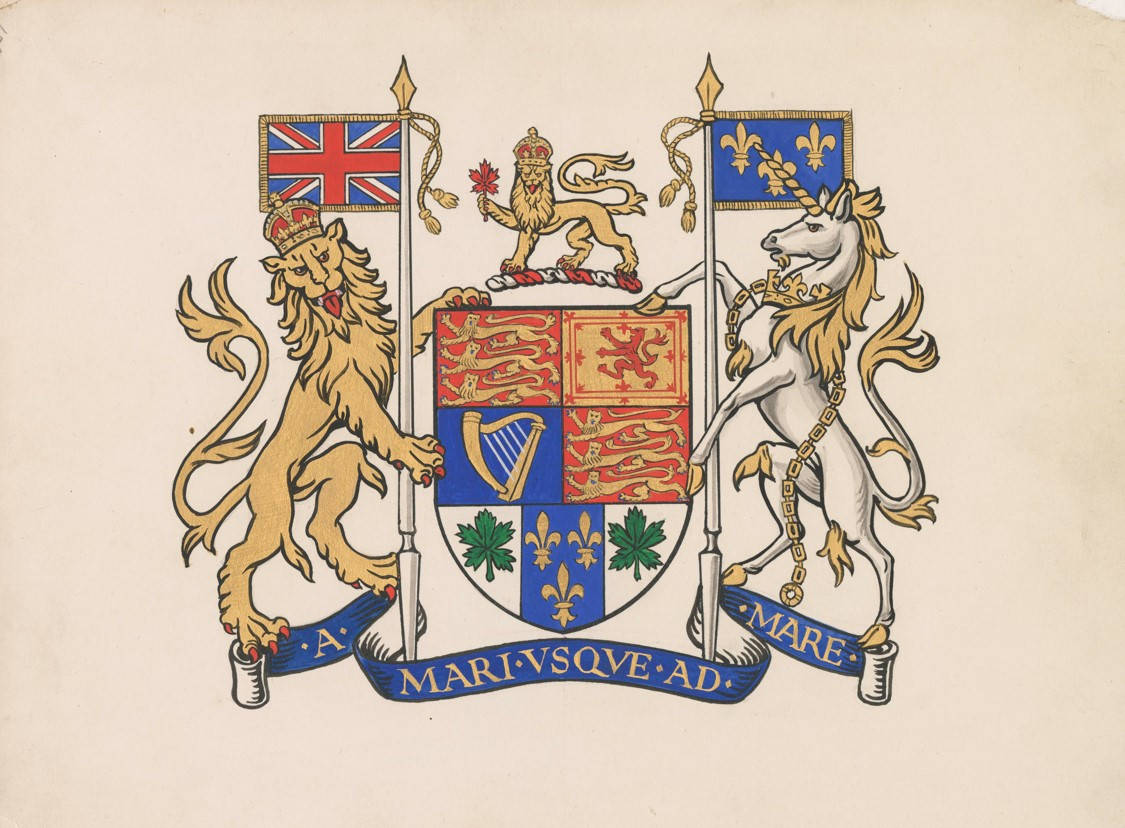
A counter-proposal from the College of Arms, September 1921, with an arrangement of fleurs-de-lis rejected by the Canadian committee

Eugène Fiset, the Deputy Minister of Defence, claimed in 1918 that the design of the arms would determine the national colours of Canada and an unnamed member of the committee stated, "the colours of the shield will become the national colours of the Dominion [...] the red maple leaf has been used in service flags to denote men who have sacrificed their lives for the country [...] The case for white is that it contains an allusion to snow, which is characteristic of our climate and our landscape in certain seasons." In the 1940s, military historian Archer Fortescue Duguid suggested King George V had chosen red and white as Canada's official colours because those were the colours in the wreath and mantling on the arms. However, Forrest Pass, a curator at Library and Archives Canada, determined there is no record of either the King or the committee giving much importance to the mantling and the royal proclamation of the coat of arms makes no mention of national colours, specifically.

With the passage of the Statute of Westminster in 1931, Canada and other Dominions became fully sovereign from the United Kingdom. This had the effect of elevating the Canadian coat of arms, which had been granted as deputed arms for particular uses in a colony, to the status of the royal arms of the King in right of the country, for general purposes throughout the country. They thus replaced the British coat of arms, which had previously been arms of general purpose throughout the British Empire, in courtrooms and on government buildings to represent the reigning monarch. This change can be seen in the Great Seal of Canada of King George VI, where the royal arms of Canada replaced the British arms, and is even more evident in the Great Seal of Canada for Queen Elizabeth II, on which the title Queen of Canada is used.

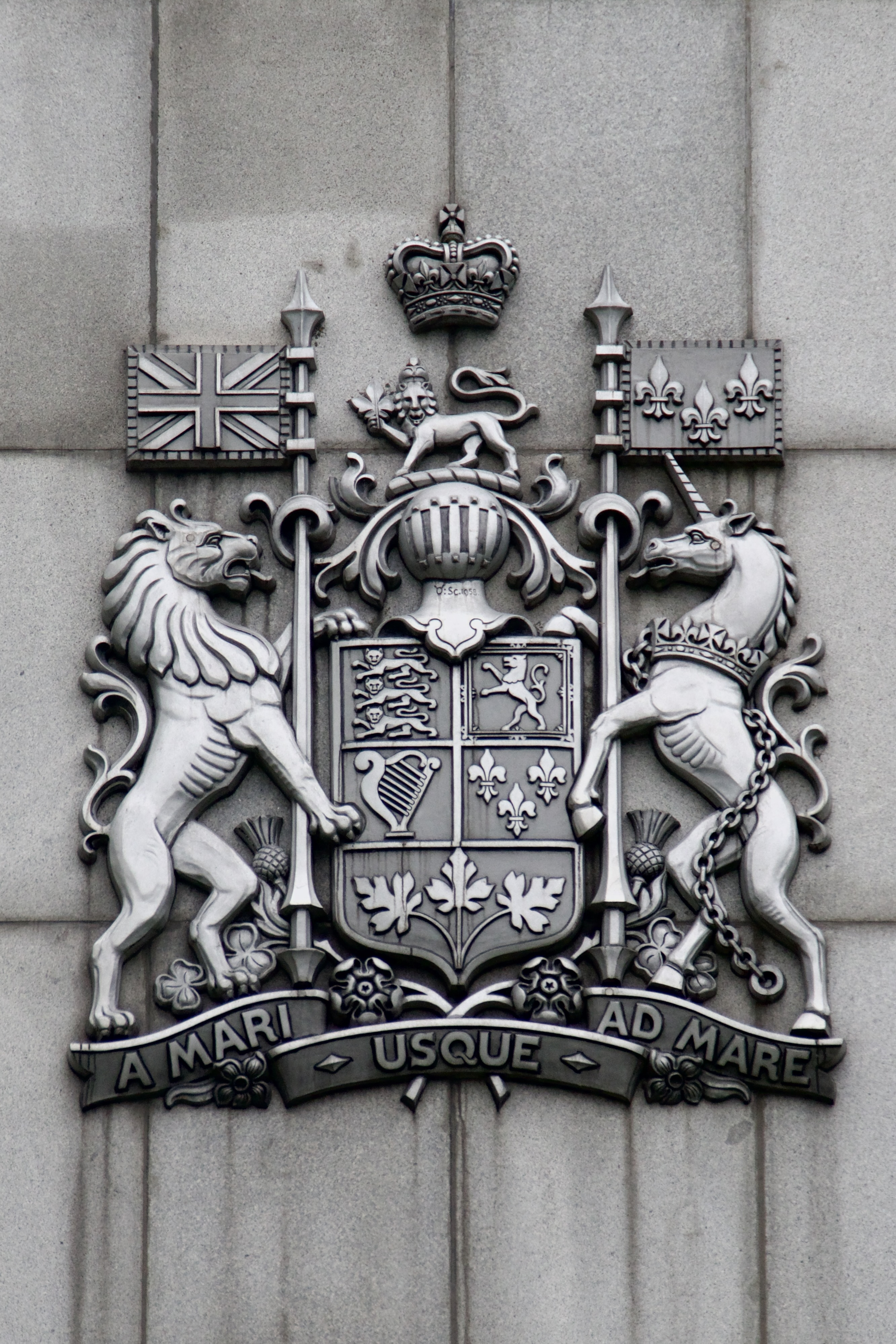
1958 sculpture of the coat of arms on the former Saint-Hyacinthe post office in Quebec, now a national historic site of Canada

By 1957, the arms were redrawn by Alan Beddoe so as to have red leaves and to change the royal crown from a Tudor design to one more resembling St Edward's Crown, as preferred by Queen Elizabeth II. To mark the 1982 patriation of the Canadian constitution, which finally ended the last vestiges of the British parliament's role in amending the constitution, a McGill University student named Bruce Hicks proposed to Secretary of State Gerald Regan that the motto of the Order of Canada—at the time, the country's highest civilian honour for merit—be placed around the shield in order to bring these royal arms into line with other royal arms displayed in Canada—holdovers from the time of French, Scottish, and English colonisation—on which a symbol of those countries' highest national order of honour appeared around the shield (the British arms displayed the Order of the Garter, the Scottish royal arms the Order of the Thistle, and the royalist arms of the French Ancien Régime the Order of the Holy Spirit and Order of Saint Michael). While unsuccessful in this first attempt, Hicks continued his campaign and was joined by a number of other amateur and professional heraldists. As a journalist in the parliamentary press gallery in Ottawa in the late 1980s and early '90s, Hicks strategically recast the change as something worth doing to commemorate the 25th anniversary of the Order of Canada's founding, in 1992; an idea that was endorsed by the Advisory Committee on the Order of Canada.

The Order of Canada circlet with the Latin motto of the Order—Desiderantes meliorem patriam ("They desire a better country")—surrounds the shield on the arms was added for limited use in 1987 and for general use in 1994.

It took until 1994 for the Queen to approve the new design for general use; though, the Canadian Heraldic Authority, established by the Queen in 1988, began to allow for its limited use beginning in 1987, where the arms were used to represent the Queen personally on letters patent granting new arms for distinguished Canadians. These letters patent carried the shield from the royal arms along with the annulus behind the shield bearing the motto of the Order of Canada—Desiderantes meliorem patriam. As soon as royal approval was forthcoming, the full achievement was redesigned for use by the federal government within the Federal Identity Program. The present design of the arms of Canada was drawn by Cathy Bursey-Sabourin, Fraser Herald at the Canadian Heraldic Authority.

Member of Parliament Pat Martin introduced, in June 2008, a motion into the House of Commons calling on the government to amend the coat of arms to incorporate symbols representing Canada's First Nations, Inuit, and Métis peoples, as Chadwick had suggested in 1917. After the coronation of King Charles III and Queen Camilla on 6 May 2023, the Canadian Heraldic Authority revealed a new Canadian Royal Crown featuring maple leaves, a snowflake, and symbols with meaning to Canada's Indigenous peoples. The authority stated changes will take place in due course.

=== Armorial evolution ===
Following Confederation in 1867, Canada initially used the United Kingdom's royal arms and provincial great seals. The arms of the first four provinces (Ontario, Quebec, Nova Scotia, and New Brunswick) were granted by royal warrant in 1868. With the admittance of new provinces and territories into Confederation the multi-quartered shield design became overly crowded. Following a federal committee formed in 1919 the country adopted its first official national coat of arms on November 21, 1921. There have been two major updates to the official emblazonment, in 1957 and 1994, resulting in three official versions.

Arms of the United Kingdom 1837

1868-1870, quartering the arms of the four founding provinces

1870–1873, addition of Manitoba

1873–1907, addition of British Columbia and Prince Edward Island

1907–1921, addition of Saskatchewan and Alberta

1921–1957 by Alexander Scott Carter (Note: Illustration by Alexander Scott "The work is signed by all four members of the committee established to provide Canada with a coat of arms. The committee consisted of Thomas Mulvey, Under-secretary of State; Sir Joseph Pope, Under-secretary of State for External Affairs; Dr. Arthur G. Doughty, Dominion Archivist; and Major-General Willoughby Gwatkin, the former Chief of the General Staff of the Canadian Militia")

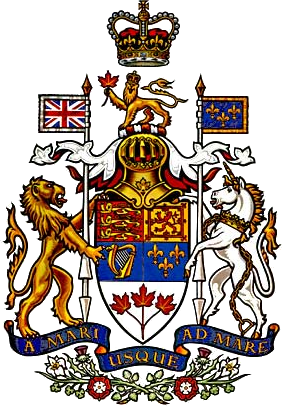
1957–1994 by Allan Beddoe

== Use ==
The coat of arms, being those of the sovereign and the state, is used to signify national sovereignty and ownership. The federal government uses the arms to represent the state under the Federal Identity Program and as a mark of authority for various government agencies and representatives, including Cabinet, and the prime minister within it, and the Supreme Court, as well as the Canadian Armed Forces and Royal Canadian Mounted Police (RCMP). In the latter two, the most senior non-commissioned ranks wear the 1957 version of the arms as a badge of rank, representing the fact that they have received the King's warrant (as opposed to the King's Commission for officers).

An example of usage of the arms on a Canadian passport

The arms of Canada is also present on all pre-polymer denominations of Canadian banknotes—printed on each bill in a way that functions as a security feature,—as well as the 50¢ coin and on the cover of Canadian passports. Permanent resident cards issued from 2009 to 2015 feature a holographic representation of the 1957 version of the coat of arms.

The full achievement of the coat of arms has been used by the Canadian government on occasion on a plain red flag, such as in 1967 for the country's centennial celebrations. It is also used on a flag in its full achievement in military ceremonies, such as Canadian Armed Forces Tattoo performances.

=== Copyright ===
The coat of arms "are a state symbol whose use for commercial purposes is prohibited in most instances". As a royal arms personal to the sovereign, they cannot be used without the King's consent. Under Crown copyright, "permission is always required when the work is being revised, adapted, or translated, regardless if the purpose of the reproduction is for personal or public non-commercial distribution."

Historical and current versions of the coat of arms (such as the 1921–1957 and 1957–1994 iterations) remain legally protected under Section 9 of Canada's Trademarks Act, registered as official marks. The arms are also protected under Canada's Copyright Act, and globally under Article 6ter of the Paris Convention for the Protection of Industrial Property.

Further, "marks and designs similar to the official symbols are pursued as a copyright or trade-mark infringement." The Trade-marks Act states that, "no person shall adopt in connection with a business, as a trade-mark or otherwise, any mark consisting of, or so nearly resembling as to be likely to be mistaken for [...] the arms, crest, or flag adopted and used at any time by Canada."

The arms are registered under Canadian trademark numbers 0972257, 0972258, and 0907729, and with the World Intellectual Property Organization (WIPO) registrations CA10 and CA11.

=== Designs derived from the arms ===
(Top to bottom) the sovereign's flag for Canada; the flag of the governor general of Canada; the badge of the House of Commons of Canada; the Canadian Red Ensign. All designs take elements from the Arms of Canada.

The banner of the arms was in 2023 also made the sovereign's flag, for use by the monarch in Canada and when representing Canada abroad. Between 1962 and 2022, the banner of arms defaced with a variant of the Queen's cypher formed the Queen's Personal Canadian Flag, for use by Queen Elizabeth II. Six additional personal flags for other members of the Canadian royal family were created in the 2010s, all using a similar design with the banner of the arms as their base. The personal flag of the governor general has, since 1981, featured the crest of the royal arms of Canada on a blue background.

With the support of former Speakers of the House of Commons John Fraser and Gilbert Parent, Bruce Hicks campaigned for the Canadian Parliament to have a distinct heraldic symbol, along the lines of the portcullis (variations of which are used by the Commons and Lords in the British Parliament). In response, Member of Parliament Derek Lee tabled a motion calling for a committee to be struck, which passed. Hicks and Robert Watt, the first Chief Herald of Canada, were called as the only two expert witnesses; though, Senator Serge Joyal joined the committee ex officio, on behalf of the Senate. The Commons' Speaker, Peter Milliken, then asked the Canadian Heraldic Authority to design such a symbol and, on 15 February 2008, the Governor General authorized the House of Commons to begin using a badge, consisting of the shield of the royal arms superimposed on the ceremonial mace (assigned to the House of Commons as a symbol of the royal authority under which it operates). Following the Commons example, the Senate then requested and obtained, exactly two months later, a similar badge for itself, with the shield of the royal arms surmounted on the mace assigned to the Senate.

== Blazon ==
The heraldic blazon of Canada's coat of arms, as declared in the 1921 proclamation, is:

Tierced in fesse the first and second divisions containing the quarterly coat following, namely, 1st, gules three lions passant guardant in pale Or, 2nd, Or a lion rampant within a double tressure flory-counter-flory gules, 3rd, azure a harp Or stringed argent, 4th, azure, three fleurs-de-lis Or, and the third division argent three maple leaves conjoined on one stem proper. And upon a royal helmet mantled argent doubled gules the crest, that is to say, on a wreath of the colours argent and gules a lion passant guardant Or imperially crowned proper and holding in the dexter paw a maple leaf gules. And for supporters on the dexter a lion rampant Or holding a lance argent, point Or, flying therefrom to the dexter the Union Flag, and on the sinister, a unicorn argent armed crined and unguled Or, gorged with a coronet composed of crosses-patée and fleurs-de-lis a chain affixed thereto reflexed of the last, and holding a like lance flying therefrom to the sinister a banner azure charged with three fleurs-de-lis Or; the whole ensigned with the Imperial Crown proper and below the shield upon a wreath composed of roses, thistles, shamrocks and lillies a scroll azure inscribed with the motto A mari usque ad mare.

The circlet of the Order of Canada was added around the shield for limited use in 1987 and for general use in 1994.

== Symbolism ==
Element	Description	Image
Crown	The coat of arms are surmounted by a rendition of St. Edward's Crown, which has been used in the coronations of Canada's monarchs. This element represents Canada's status as a constitutional monarchy headed by a sovereign king or queen. This style of crown was that preferred by Queen Elizabeth II, and was modernized in 1957 from the 1921 design, which used the Tudor crown.	
Crest	The crest is based on the Royal Crest of the United Kingdom but differenced by the addition of a maple leaf, and symbolizes the sovereignty of Canada. It appears on the flag of the Governor-General, symbolizing that the Governor-General is a representative of the Sovereign. The crest consists of a crowned gold lion standing on a twisted wreath of red and white silk and holding a maple leaf in its right paw.	
Helm	The arms show a royal helmet, which is a barred helm of gold embossed with a maple leaf design looking outward, with mantling of white and red, stylized in the official version to look like maple leaves.	
Escutcheon	The escutcheon is divided into five sections that represent Canada's foundational European cultures with a sprig of three maple leaves at the base to represent the modern ethnically diverse nation. The first division at the viewer's top left contains the three golden lions that have been a symbol of England since at least the reign of King Richard I. The second quarter bears the red lion rampant of Scotland in a double treasure border with fleurs-de-lis, used as a symbol of Scotland since at least the reign of William I. The third quarter shows the Irish harp of Tara. The fourth quarter shows the Royal Banner of France or "Bourbon Flag" with three gold fleurs-de-lis on blue field arranged two and one, symbolizing royal France. The fifth charge, a sprig of red maple leaves at the bottom, is, at first, a distinctly French Canadian symbol that became gradually identified with the entire country throughout the end of the 19th century. The arrangement of three leaves on one sprig was first seen on a Saint-Jean-Baptiste Day poster in 1850. Initially, in 1921, the leaves were depicted as coloured green because it was thought to represent youth. The leaves' red redesign was officially updated in 1957; this would match the national colours of Canada that became official in 1965 when the national flag was adopted. The shield forms the basis of the royal standards of Canada.	
Ribbon	The ribbon (also called a circlet) is marked desiderantes meliorem patriam, meaning "desiring a better country", which is the motto of the Order of Canada, taken from Hebrews 11:16. This component was added by the Queen in 1987 on the advice of Prime Minister Brian Mulroney. With the patriation of oversight of arms to Canada through the Canadian Heraldic Authority the following year, the constitution of the Order of Canada was amended to include entitlement by all recipients to encircle their own arms with the ribbon if arms are granted to them. Since 1994 the arms used by government ministers and institutions have slowly changed to reflect the new version with the ribbon.	
Motto	The motto of Canada is in Latin a mari usque ad mare (From sea to sea), a part of Psalm 72:8. This phrase was suggested by Joseph Pope, then-Under Secretary of State, when the Arms were redesigned in 1921. The motto was originally used in 1906 on the head of the mace of the Legislative Assembly of Saskatchewan. In March 2006, the premiers of Canada's three territories called for the amendment of the motto to better reflect the vast geographic nature of Canada's territory, as Canada has coastlines on the Arctic, Atlantic, and Pacific Oceans. Two suggestions for a new motto are A mari ad mare ad mare (from sea to sea to sea) and A mari usque ad maria (from the sea to the other seas).	
Supporters	Supporting the shield on either side are the English lion and Scottish unicorn, which are also the supporters of the UK coat of arms. The English lion stands on the viewer's left and holds a gold-pointed silver lance flying the Royal Union Flag. The Scottish unicorn has a gold horn, a gold mane, gold hooves, and around its neck a gold, chained coronet of crosses and fleurs-de-lis; it holds a lance flying a banner of royalist France, the three gold fleurs-de-lis on a blue background. Unlike the British version, the lion is not crowned, nor is it facing the viewer. The broken chain on the unicorn symbolizes the unicorn's resistance to oppression.	
Compartment	The entire coat of arms rests on the compartment, which is made up of the floral emblems of the founding nations. The Tudor rose is the floral badge of England and Wales, combining the White Rose of York and the Red Rose of Lancaster. The thistle and shamrock are the symbols of Scotland and Ireland, respectively, while the fleur-de-lis has been the royal symbol of France since the 12th century.	

== See also ==
Click on a province/territory for coat of arms
- Coat of arms of Vancouver
- Coat of arms of Ottawa
- Coat of arms of Toronto
- Coat of arms of Montreal
- Coat of arms of Quebec City
- List of Canadian provincial and territorial symbols
- National symbols of Canada
- Canadian royal symbols
