= Flag of the governor general of Canada =

Governor General of Canada
- Use: Viceregal standard
- Proportion: 2:3 on land; 1:2 at sea (shown)
- Adopted: 1870 (original version); 1981 (current version first adopted); 2002 (current version re-adopted)
- Design: The viceregal badge (a crowned gold lion standing on a twisted wreath of red and white silk and holding a maple leaf in its right paw) featured on a navy blue background.

The flag of the governor general of Canada is a symbol to mark the presence of the governor general of Canada. Such a flag has been used by governors general since just after Canadian Confederation, and the design has altered over decades. The current flag was adopted in 1981.

== Design ==
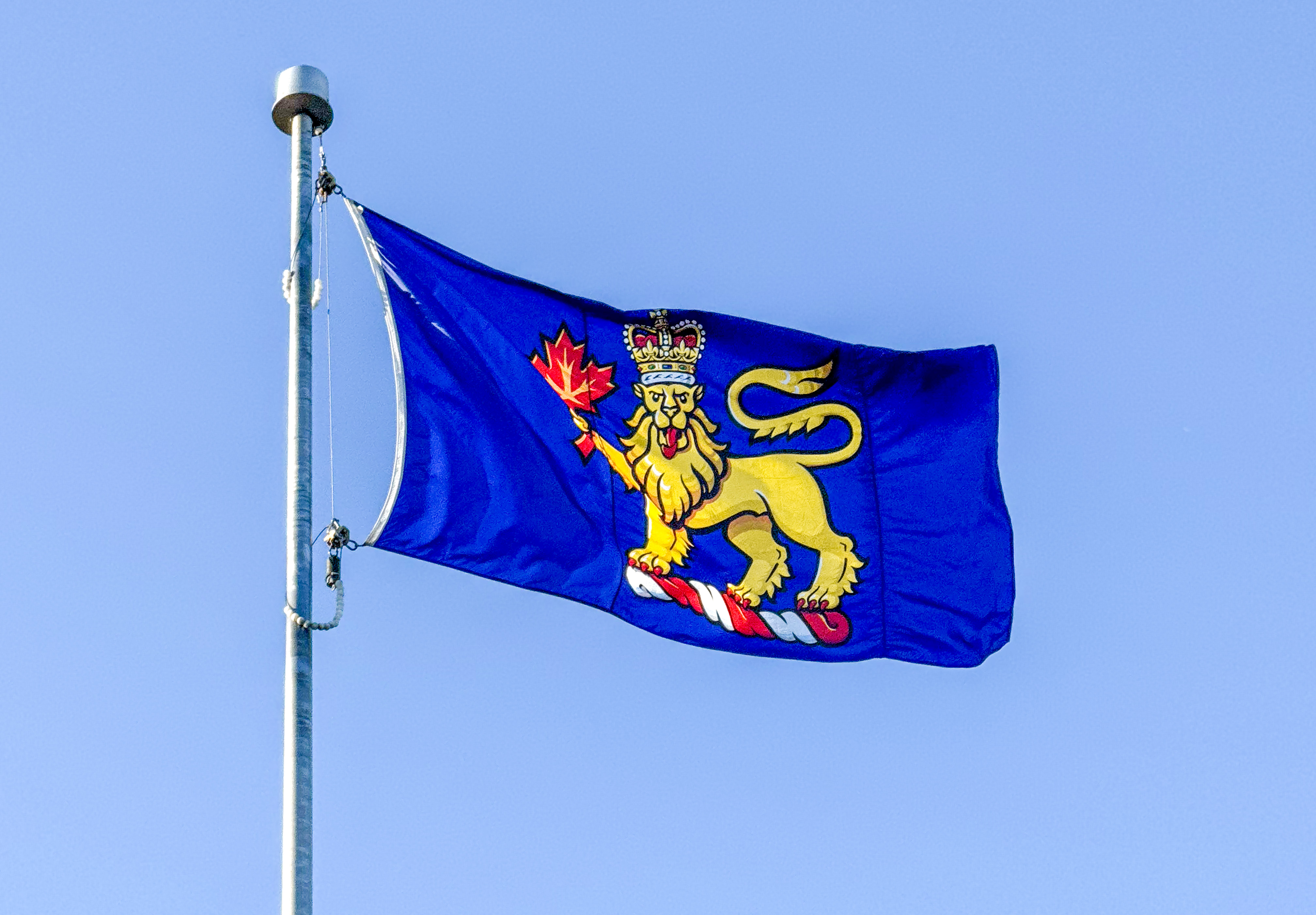
The flag above the Citadelle of Quebec

The first governor general's flag was adopted in 1870 and followed the design of other viceregal flags in use throughout the British Empire at the time: a Union Flag defaced with the shield of the coat of arms of Canada; though, in contrast to other imperial governors, the wreath surrounding the central badge was one of maple instead of laurel leaves. The design was updated in 1921 to incorporate changes to the appearance of Canada's coat of arms, and again in 1931 to reflect developments in Canada's constitutional structure brought about by the Statute of Westminster, whereby the governor general became the personal representative of the monarch of Canada, rather than a representative of the British monarch in Canada, as it was previously. Still, the composition was the same for all the governor general of the Dominions: a blue field containing, at the centre, the crest of the royal coat of arms of the United Kingdom above a scroll bearing the country's name.

The current flag was first introduced in 1981 and comprises the crest of the Royal Coat of Arms of Canada—a crowned lion holding a red maple leaf in its paw, standing on a wreath of red and white (Canada's official colours)—on a blue background. Given the lion in the crest of Canada's arms holds a red maple leaf—which formed the centrepiece of the National Flag adopted in 1965—the need for the scroll showing Canada's name was eliminated. The only other national viceregal flags that differ from the norm are the flag of the governor-general of New Zealand—which displays the crowned shield of the coat of arms of New Zealand on a blue field—and the flag of the governor-general of Solomon Islands—which uses the common form, but with the name of the country written across a gold silhouette of a two-headed frigatebird.

While Roméo LeBlanc served as governor general, between 1995 and 1999, the flag was modified at his direction so that the lion's tongue and claws were removed, making the animal appear more "Canadian" in LeBlanc's opinion. These changes were reversed in 2002, while Adrienne Clarkson was in office.

The flag is protected under the Trade-Marks Act; Section 9(c) states, "No person shall adopt in connection with a business, as a trade-mark or otherwise, any mark consisting of, or so nearly resembling as to be likely to be mistaken for [...] the standard, arms, or crest of His Excellency the Governor General."

== Use ==
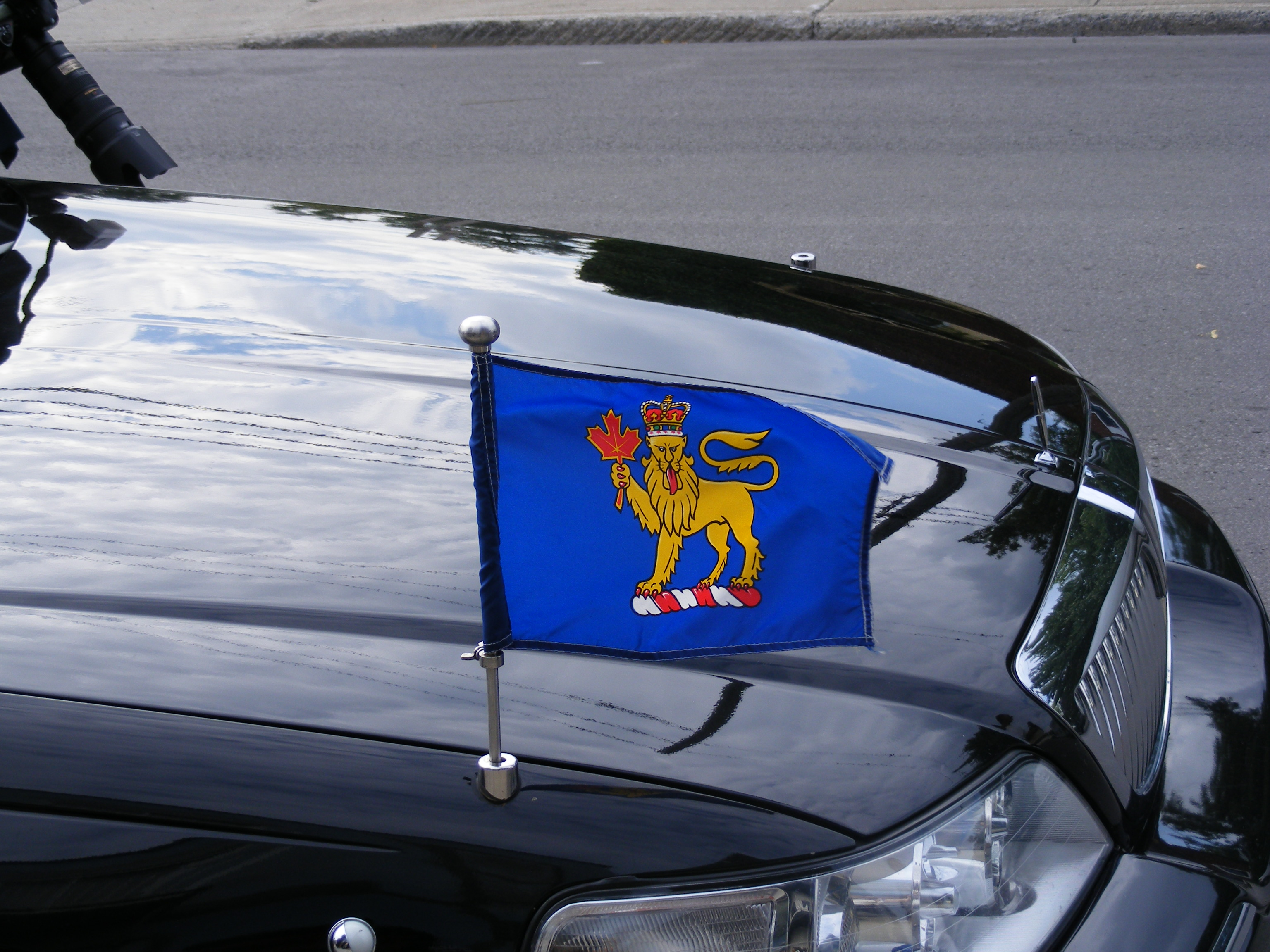
The flag affixed to the governor general's official car in 2007

The flag is flown from the governor general's official residences—Rideau Hall and La Citadelle—and any other building the governor general is visiting. It may also be flown from any vehicle being used by the governor general. On overseas visits, the national flag is used to identify the governor general.

The flag takes precedence over the National Flag and the personal standards of any member of the royal family other than the sovereign, but not ahead of the royal standard or the flag of a lieutenant governor of a province at a function hosted by that lieutenant governor.

== Historical versions ==
| Flag | Date | Description |
|---|---|---|
| | 1869–1901 | The Union Jack, defaced with a white circle, at the centre of which is the crowned shield of arms of Canada in 1869, surrounded by a wreath of green maple leaves. |
| | 1901–1921 | The Union Jack, defaced with a white circle, at the centre of which is the crowned shield of arms of Canada in 1869, surrounded by a wreath of green maple leaves. |
| | 1921–1931 | The Union Jack, defaced with a white circle, at the centre of which is the crowned shield of arms of Canada in 1921, surrounded by a wreath of stylize green maple leaves. |
| | 1931–1952 | The royal crest from the coat of arms of the United Kingdom, with 'Canada' on a golden scroll below. The crown in the crest is the Tudor crown. |
| | 1952–1981 | The royal crest from the coat of arms of the United Kingdom, with 'Canada' on a golden scroll below. The crown in the crest is the St. Edward's crown. |
| | 1981–1999 | The crest of the Royal Coat of Arms of Canada on a blue background. |
| | 1999–2002 | Roméo LeBlanc requested that the tongue and claws of the lion be removed. The changes were reverted after the end of his tenure, during the office of Adrienne Clarkson. |
| | 2002–present | Reverted back to the crest of the Royal Coat of Arms of Canada on a blue background. |

== See also ==
- Canadian royal symbols
- Flags of the lieutenant governors of Canada
- List of Canadian flags
- National symbols of Canada
