= Royal flags of Canada =

Personal flags of the Canadian royal family

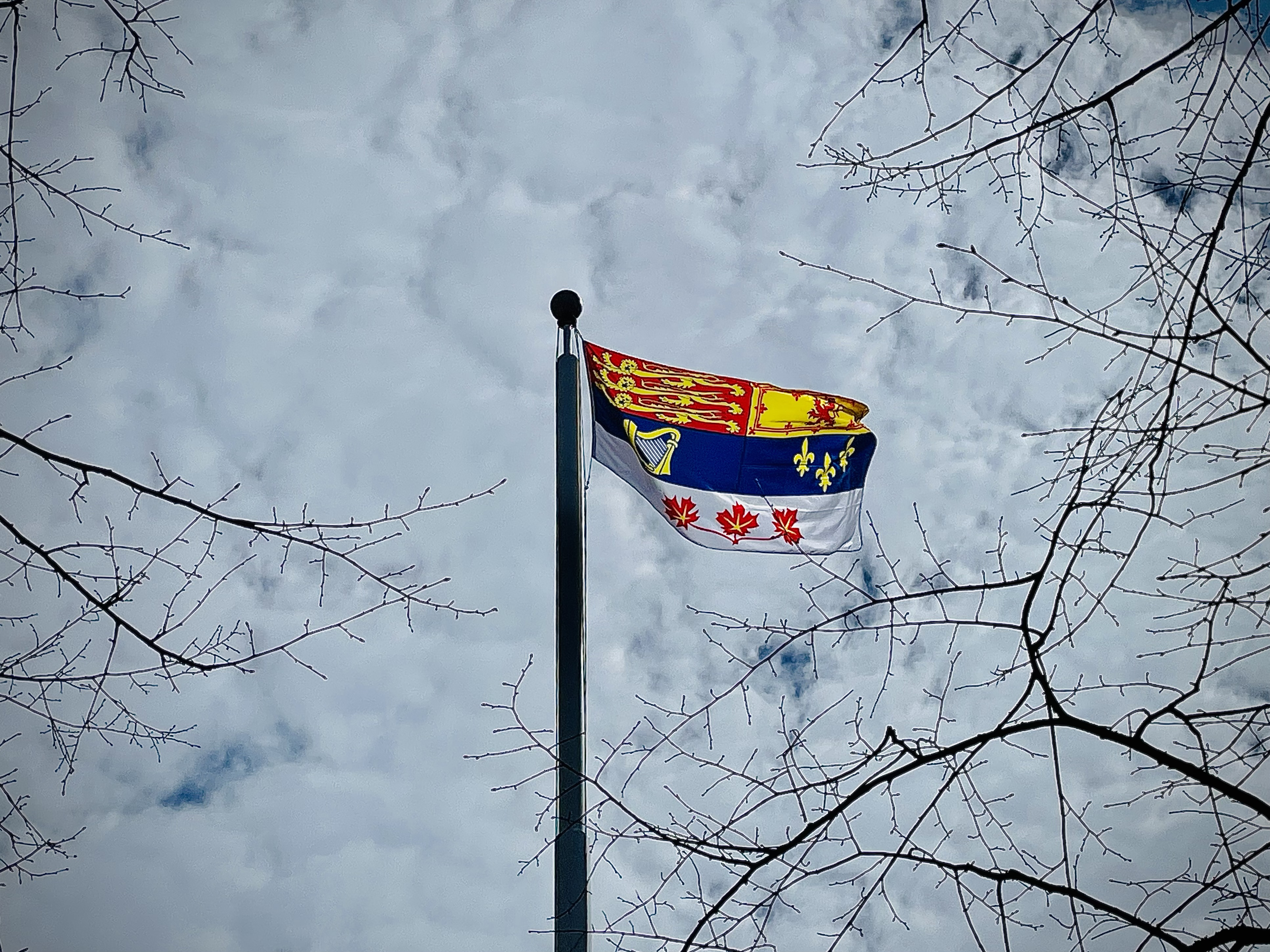
The Sovereign’s Flag for Canada flies outside Government House in Halifax to mark the Coronation of Charles III

The royal flags of Canada are a set of heraldic flags used by members of the Canadian royal family to denote the presence of the bearer within a vehicle, building, or area within Canada or when representing Canada abroad. All of the flags are derived from the coat of arms of Canada, which are the arms of dominion of the Canadian monarch.

The flag of the monarch is a banner of arms, that is the escutcheon or shield of the Canadian coat of arms in flag form. The flags belonging to the Prince of Wales; Anne, Princess Royal; Andrew Mountbatten-Windsor; and Prince Edward, Duke of Edinburgh, are differentiated by heraldic labels and roundels with personal identifiers within. A flag with an ermine border is used by royal family members who do not have a personal flag.

The first flag was created for Queen Elizabeth II in 1962, and the remainder over the subsequent decades. The current flag for the monarch was unveiled on 6 May 2023, the day of King Charles III's coronation. The flags are part of a larger collection of Canadian royal symbols.

== Current flags ==
There are several flags created by the Canadian Heraldic Authority which are currently in use by the Canadian monarch, the Prince of Wales, and other members of the Canadian royal family.

=== Sovereign ===
Sovereign’s Flag for Canada
- The Sovereign’s personal Canadian flag
- Use: Other
- Adopted: 6 May 2023; 3 years ago
- Design: A quartered field, with three golden lions top left, a red lion rampant surrounded by a double border with fleurs-de-lis top right, a golden harp bottom left, and three gold fleurs-de-lis bottom right. At the base is a sprig of three red maple leaves.

The Sovereign’s Flag for Canada (also called the Sovereign’s personal Canadian flag and the Royal Standard of Canada) is a banner of arms of the coat of arms of Canada, and is used to denote the presence of the Canadian monarch. It consists of the escutcheon or shield of the coat of arms, namely the quartered arms of the kingdoms of England, Scotland, Ireland, and France above three maple leaves on a silver background. The official blazon of the arms is:

Tierced in fess the first and second divisions containing the quarterly coat following, namely, 1st, gules three lions passant guardant in pale Or, 2nd, Or a lion rampant within a double tressure flory-counter-flory gules, 3rd, azure a harp Or stringed argent, 4th, azure, three fleurs-de-lis Or, and the third division argent three maple leaves conjoined on one stem proper.

The flag was created by the Canadian Heraldic Authority in 2023 for Charles III in his capacity as King of Canada. The flag was approved in April 2023, shortly after Charles' ascension, and was unveiled on his coronation day, 6 May 2023. The flag is protected under Canada's Trademarks Act.

Elizabeth II, the monarch preceding Charles III, had from 1962 until her death in 2022 used a flag that incorporated the Canadian banner of arms charged with her personal badge. This flag was personal to her, whereas the sovereign's flag is designed for use by all future Canadian monarchs.

=== Prince of Wales ===
Flag of the Prince of Wales for personal use in Canada
- Personal flag of The Prince of Wales for use in Canada
- Use: Other
- Adopted: 31 May 2011; 15 years ago
- Design: A banner of the Royal Arms of Canada, charged with the badge of the Prince of Wales at its centre and a three-point white label at its top.

The flag of The Prince of Wales consists of a banner of arms of the coat of arms of Canada, differentiated from that of the monarch by a white heraldic label of three points and, in the centre, a blue disc or roundel within a wreath of golden maple leaves, within which are the Prince of Wales' feathers. The initial concept for the design was created by Claire Boudreau, the Chief Herald of Canada, with assistance from other heralds of the Canadian Heraldic Authority and with the co-operation of Buckingham Palace officials.

The flag was approved for use by Elizabeth II through letters patent dated 31 May 2011, and gazetted in the Canada Gazette on 24 March 2012. It was unveiled to the public on 29 June 2011, alongside the personal flag for William, then Duke of Cambridge, prior to his 2011 royal tour of Canada.

=== Other royal family members with personal flags ===
As of 2024, Anne, Princess Royal, Andrew Mountbatten-Windsor, and Prince Edward, Duke of Edinburgh have personal flags for use in Canada.

The flags are similar to those of the Prince of Wales, consisting of a banner of arms of the coat of arms of Canada, differenced by a silver heraldic label and, in the centre, a blue roundel with a border of 24 gold maple leaves. Each roundel contains the bearer's cypher—the initial of their first name surmounted by the coronet of a child of the monarch. The labels are derived from the bearer's coats of arms: Anne's has a red heart on the centre point and red crosses on the outer points, Andrew's has a blue anchor on the centre point, and Edward's has a Tudor rose on the centre point. The initial concept for these designs created by Claire Boudreau, the Chief Herald of Canada, with assistance from other heralds of the Canadian Heraldic Authority.

The personal flag for Princess Anne, was approved for use by Elizabeth II on 8 May 2013, and the personal flags for the former Prince Andrew and Prince Edward on 15 May 2014.

Anne, Princess Royal

Andrew Mountbatten-Windsor

Prince Edward, Duke of Edinburgh

=== Flag for other members of the royal family ===
Flag for Members of the Royal Family for use in Canada
- Use: Other
- Adopted: 20 December 2014; 11 years ago
- Design: A banner of the Royal Arms of Canada with an ermine border

The flag for members of the royal family is used by those members of the family without a personal Canadian flag.

The flag consists of the banner of the coat of arms of Canada surrounded by an ermine border, a design also seen on British flags of royal family members without personal flags. The initial concept for the design was done by Claire Boudreau, the Chief Herald of Canada, with assistance from other heralds of the Canadian Heraldic Authority.

This flag was approved for use by Elizabeth II on 20 December 2014, and was gazetted in the Canada Gazette on 3 October 2015.

== Use and protocol ==
As the monarch is the personification of the Canadian state, their banner takes precedence above all other flags in Canada, including the national flag and those of the other members of the Canadian royal family.

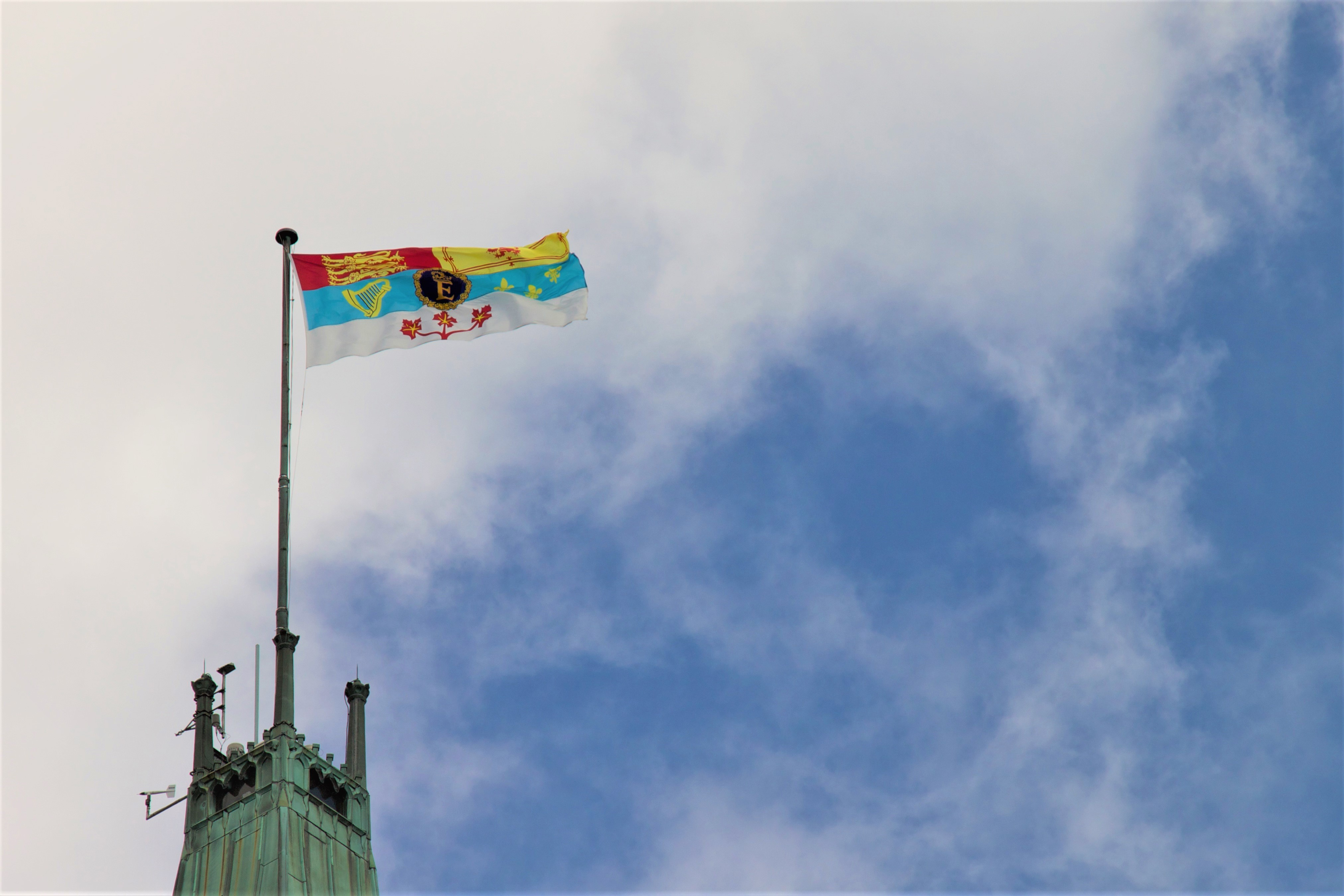
Queen Elizabeth II's Canadian flag flies atop the Peace Tower as she attended Canada Day festivities on Parliament Hill, 2010

The Sovereign's Flag is usually used only when they are in Canada or attending an event abroad as the Canadian head of state; for example, the flag will be unfurled at Juno Beach in France when the sovereign is present there for commemorations of the Normandy Landings. The flag must be broken immediately upon the sovereign's arrival and fly day and night until lowered directly after their departure from any building, ship, aircraft (not in the air), or other space or vehicle.

The flag may only be used by the sovereign. The governor general, the monarch's representative in Canada, possesses a unique personal flag, as do each of the monarch's provincial viceroys. Flags are kept at the monarch's Ottawa residence, Rideau Hall, and supplied to Department of Canadian Heritage royal visit staff by the household staff prior to the monarch's arrival.

The above protocol is sometimes, though rarely, broken. On 9 August 1902, the day of the coronation of King Edward VII, the monarch's royal flag (then the same in Canada as in the United Kingdom) was raised on a temporary flag pole at Royal Naval Dockyard, Halifax, Nova Scotia. Similarly, for the coronation of Queen Elizabeth II on 2 June 1953, the sovereign's royal flag was broken atop the Peace Tower on Parliament Hill in Ottawa. Sixty years later, on 6 February 2012, Elizabeth II's personal flag for Canada was unfurled at Rideau Hall and Parliament Hill, as well as at other legislatures across the country to mark the monarch's diamond anniversary of her accession to the throne; permission to do so was granted by the Queen.

When a police service horse, Burmese, was presented to Queen Elizabeth II by the Royal Canadian Mounted Police on 28 April 1969, she requested that Burmese perform in the Royal Windsor Horse Show and that the rider carry the Queen's royal flag on the lance, instead of the usual red and white pennon, thus allowing Elizabeth to easily follow Burmese's performance.

== History ==
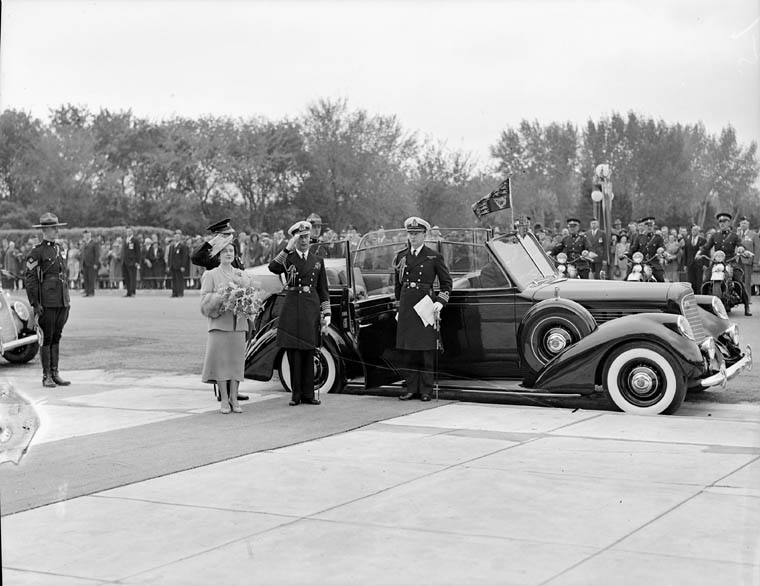
The vehicle carrying King George VI and Queen Elizabeth flying the British Royal Standard atop the windshield during the 1939 royal tour of Canada.

Prior to the adoption of the Canadian royal flags, members of the royal family who toured Canada used the royal flag they employed when in the United Kingdom; although, for the tour undertaken in 1860 Albert, Prince of Wales (the future Edward VII), he used the banner of his mother Queen Victoria. After 1931, each of those flags took on a dual role of representing a member of either the British or the Canadian royal family, depending on the context.

Queen Elizabeth II's personal Canadian flag was the first Canada-specific flag. It was used from 1962 to 2022.

Elizabeth II was the first Canadian monarch to use a distinct flag for her role as Queen of Canada. Adopted in 1962, it consisted of the banner of the coat of arms of Canada with the Queen's personal device in the centre—a blue roundel with a border of gold roses, containing within it a capital E surmounted by a crown. It was added to the Canadian Heraldic Authority's Public Register of Arms, Flags, and Badges on 15 March 2005. Nathan Tidridge argued the introduction of this flag set red and white as the national colours of Canada. However, there is debate over whether the proclamation of the coat of arms in 1921 determined Canada's national colours.

The next two personal flags were created for Charles, then Prince of Wales, and William, then Duke of Cambridge, and were revealed on 29 June 2011. The creation of the flags made Canada the second Commonwealth realm, after the United Kingdom, to adopt unique flags for members of the royal family.

William's flag consisted of the banner of arms with, in the centre, a blue roundel with a border of 12 gold maple leaves alternating with 12 gold scallops and, within this, his cypher—a W surmounted by a coronet of a child of the heir apparent. The label had a red scallop on the centre point. It was first flown from the Canadian Forces airplane that carried him and his wife, Catherine, to Canada in 2011.

The Canadian personal flag of Prince William, Duke of Cambridge, from 2011 to 2022.

Charles's flag, which is now used by William as Prince of Wales, was first flown from the Royal Canadian Air Force airplane that carried him and his wife, Camilla, to Canada for a royal tour marking the Diamond Jubilee of Elizabeth II in 2012.

Additional personal flags were created in subsequent years, with the first use of Princess Royal's banner occurring during her October 2013 visits to CFB Borden and CFB Kingston. Prince Edward's flag was first used on 12 September 2014, during a visit to Government House, British Columbia, with his wife Sophie, as part of a royal tour.

Sean Palmer asserted in the 2018 book, The Canadian Kingdom: 150 Years of Constitutional Monarchy, that, by way of creating the uniquely Canadian flags for members of the royal family other than the monarch, Canada took "'ownership', not only of the Queen of Canada, but, of the other members of her family as well", and that doing so was another formal affirmation of the concept of a Canadian royal family "as distinct as the Queen of Canada is from the Queen of the United Kingdom". Jai Patel and Sally Raudon also noted the following year that the purpose of these heraldic banners was to recognize the owners' roles as members of the Canadian royal family.

=== Coronation flag ===
The coronation of monarchs at Westminster Abbey have included flags from of various countries, carried by officials in a procession into the abbey. The flags carried in for the coronations of King George V in 1911, King George VI in 1937, and Queen Elizabeth II in 1953, were the countries' banners of arms. The flag carried in by Canadian officials in 1911 was quartered with the arms of the first four Canadian provinces, while the flag carried in for the 1937 and 1953 coronations was based on the escutcheon of the Canadian coat of arms, as devised in 1921.

The coronation of Charles III saw representatives from the Commonwealth realms carry their respective national flag instead of a banner of arms.

Coronation flag used in 1911

Coronation flag used in 1937 and 1953

Coronation flag used in 2023

== See also ==
- Canadian Red Ensign
- Flags of Charles III
- Flags of Elizabeth II
- List of Canadian flags
- National symbols of Canada
