= A mari usque ad mare =

National motto of Canada

The motto within the current Canadian coat of arms

A mari usque ad mare (Latin: [aː ˈmariː ˈuːskʷɛ ad ˈmarɛ]; French: D'un océan à l'autre, French pronunciation: [dœ̃nɔseˈã aˈloʊ̯tʁ]; English: From sea to sea) is the Canadian national motto. The phrase comes from the Latin Vulgate translation of Psalm 72:8 in the Bible:

"Et dominabitur a mari usque ad mare, et a flumine usque ad terminos terrae"
(King James Bible: "He shall have dominion also from sea to sea, and from the river unto the ends of the earth").

== History ==
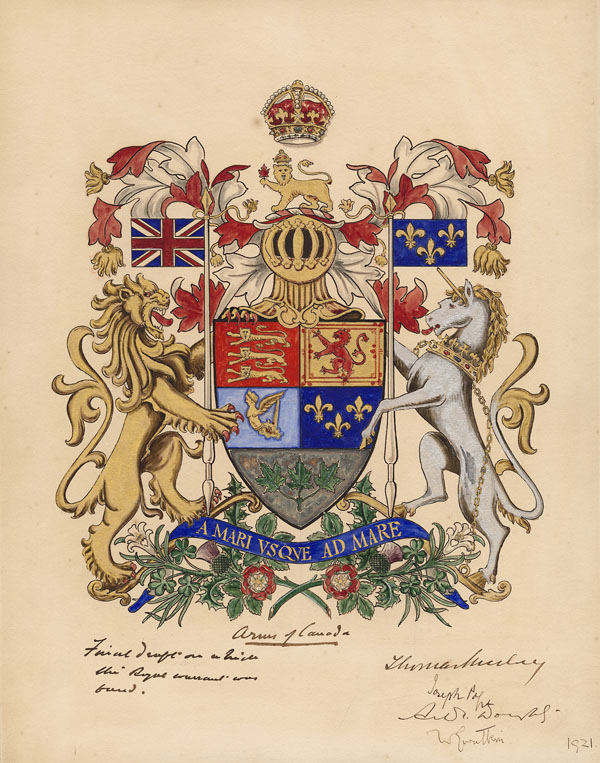
The Arms of Canada as designed in 1921 with the national motto and original green maple leaves.

An early use of the phrase was by George Monro Grant, who wrote a book called Ocean to Ocean about the geographic span of Canada, and who was Sandford Fleming's secretary and a Presbyterian minister who used the phrase in his sermons. His great-grandson Michael Ignatieff suggests that Grant used the phrase in a nation-building effort during the construction of the Canadian Pacific Railway. The use of the word dominion in Psalm 72:8 reflected the common use of the name "Dominion of Canada" for the new country.

The motto was first officially used in 1906 on the head of the mace of the new Legislative Assembly of Saskatchewan. This phrase was suggested for a national motto by Joseph Pope, then-Under Secretary of State, when the Canadian coat of arms was redesigned in 1921. Pope was a member of the four-person committee appointed by the federal government to redesign the coat of arms (the other members were Thomas Mulvey, A.G. Doughty and Major-General W.G. Gwatkin). No motto had been included in the original design. Major-General W.G. Gwatkin proposed in memoriam in spem ("in memory, in hope") as a motto, but Pope's proposal garnered more support. The draft design was approved by order in council on April 21, 1921, and by the royal proclamation of King George V on November 21, 1921.

As part of the Canadian coat of arms, the motto is used as a mark of authority by various government agencies and representatives. It is also present on all denominations of Canadian banknotes, and on the cover of Canadian passports. On its own, it appears on all federal government proclamations.

== Proposed amendment ==
In March 2007, the premiers of Canada's three territories called for the amendment of the motto to reflect the vast geographic nature of Canada's territory, as Canada has coastlines on the Arctic, Atlantic, and Pacific Oceans. Two suggestions for a new motto are A mari ad mare ad mare (from sea to sea to sea) and A mari usque ad maria (from the sea to the other seas). The expanded informal version of the motto ("from sea to sea to sea") is used in speeches and writings about Canada, representing inclusiveness toward northern residents and the growing significance of the Arctic in Canada's political and economic future. A Canwest Global-commissioned poll showed proponents of amending the motto outnumbering opponents in the ratio of three to one, with one-third of those polled neutral.

== See also ==
- Great Seal of Canada
- National symbols of Canada
- List of Canadian provincial and territorial symbols
- List of national mottos
- From the river to the sea
