= National symbols of Canada =

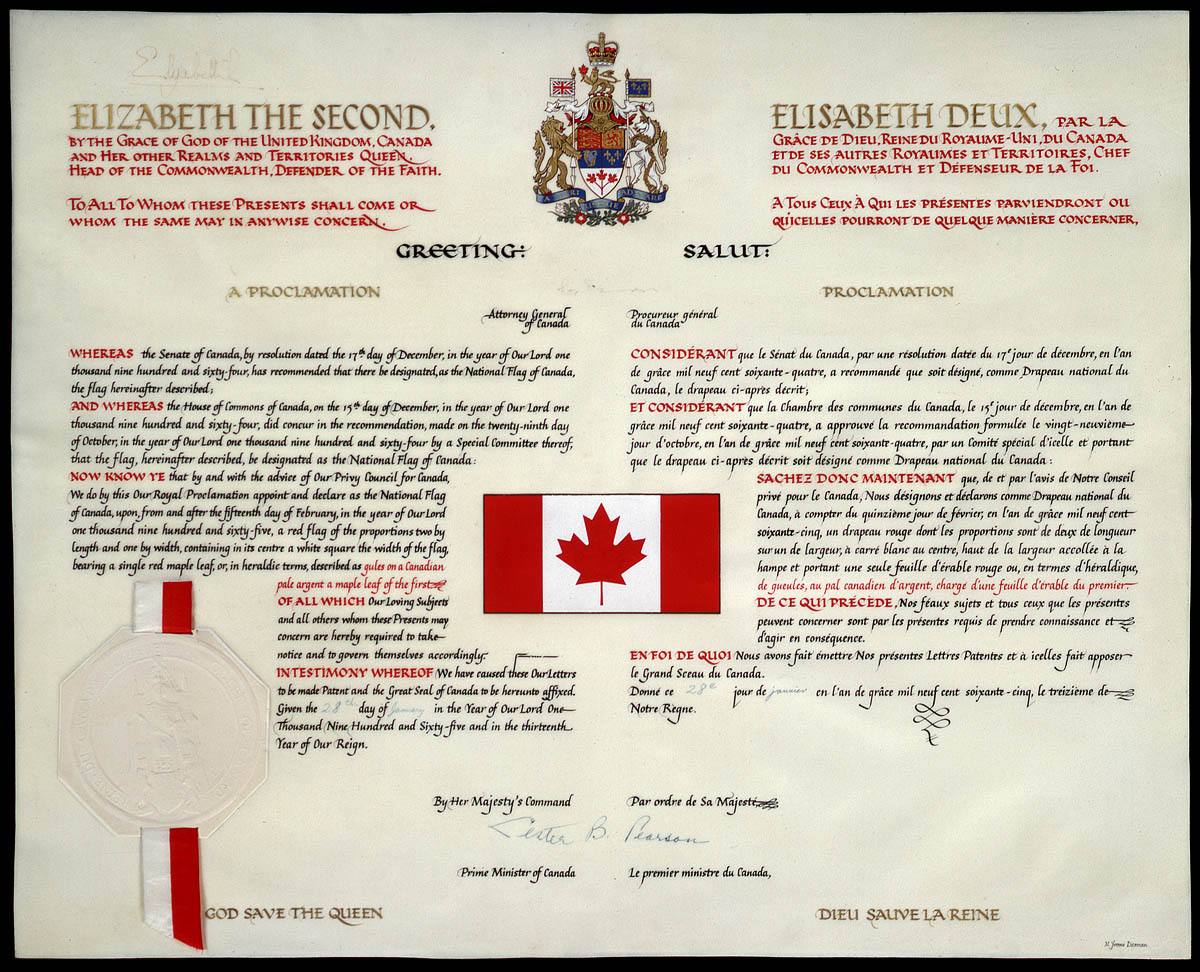
The royal proclamation of the flag of Canada featuring the coat of arms, national colours ribbon and wax great seal imprint

Over the course of centuries, a multitude of national symbols and material items have arisen as uniquely Canadian or possessing uniquely Canadian characteristics. These symbols and items represent the culture of Canada—protectionism of that culture, identity, values, nationalism, and the heritage of its inhabitants.

Themes and symbols of nature, pioneers, trappers, and traders played an important part in the early development of Canadian symbolism. Modern symbols emphasize the country's geography, cold climate, lifestyles, and the Canadianization of traditional European and Indigenous symbols.

Canada's official national symbols include the sugar maple, the beaver, the coat of arms, and the national flag. The country also has official government symbols like the Canada wordmark and corporate signatures, used in the Federal Identity Program. Additionally, the Great Seal of Canada is used on state documents.

== Predominant national cultural symbols ==
Canada’s national identity is represented by official emblems, multicultural symbolism, shared civic values and its historic folklore, by Indigenous and European cultures. Themes and symbols of pioneers, trappers, and traders played an important part in the early development of Canadian culture. By the 19th century, Canadians came to believe themselves possessed of a unique "northern character," due to the long, harsh winters that only those of hardy body and mind could survive. The Canadianization during the 1970s and 1980s integrated many traditional European and Indigenous symbols.

Canada's most well known symbol is the maple leaf from the sugar maple, which was first used by French colonists in the 1700s. Since the 1850s, under British rule, the maple leaf has been used on military uniforms and, subsequently, engraved on the headstones of individuals who have served in the Canadian Armed Forces. The maple leaf is prominently depicted on the country's current and previous flags and on the country's coat of arms. Canada's official tartan, known as the "Maple leaf tartan", consists of four colours reflecting those of the maple leaf as it changes through the seasons—green in the spring, gold in the early autumn, red at the first frost, and brown after falling.

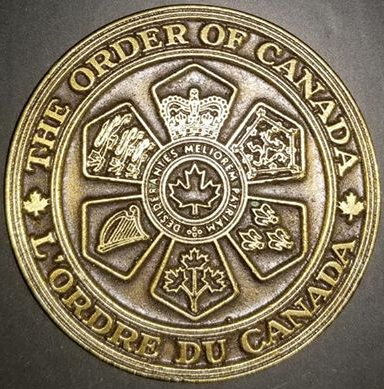
Seal of the Order of Canada, the country's second highest civilian honour for merit and Canada's first order established in 1967. Each of the six arms of the snowflake bears one of the heraldic elements taken from the Arms of Canada (Note: Five Canadian heraldic elements represent Canada's foundational European ancestral cultures: • The three lions of England • The lion rampant of Scotland • The harp of Ireland • The fleur-de-lis of France • The sprig of three maple leaves at the base The uppermost (sixth) arm of the snowflake displays the Royal Crown)

The national motto, "A mari usque ad mare" ("From Sea to Sea"), and the Order of Canada whose motto is "Desiderantes meliorem patriam" ("They desire a better country") that features a snowflake, the Royal Crown, a maple leaf and the national colours of Canada are historically symbolic. The sports of ice hockey and lacrosse, the beaver, Canada goose, common loon, Canadian horse, the Royal Canadian Mounted Police, the Canadian Rockies, the Canadian Parliament Buildings, and, more recently, the canadianization of Indigenous totem poles and Inuksuks (piles of stones) are prominent symbols.

Other symbols include; the moose, Hudson's Bay point blanket, tuques (knit cap), canoes, the Fleur-de-lys, and a variety of "identifiers" used by the Federal Identity Program such as the Canada wordmark as seen on the Canadarm(s). Many Canadian coins feature national symbols: the loon on the $1 coin, the Arms of Canada on the 50¢ piece, and the beaver on the nickel. An image of the monarch appears on $20 bank notes and the obverse of coins, with Canadarm2 appearing on the $5 note, and a female peacekeeper on the $10 bank note series. The maple leaf was featured on the penny before circulation of that coin was stopped in 2013.

Canadians personally identify with the country's institutions of health care, military peacekeeping, the national park system, and the Canadian Charter of Rights and Freedoms. Canadian cuisine such as Bannock, BeaverTails, Canadian beer, caesar (cocktail), maple syrup, nanaimo bars, butter tarts, and the Quebec dishes of poutine and tourtière have been defined as distinctly Canadian.

Canadian folklore legends such as the Sasquatch, Ogopogo, and Wendigo, alongside French-Canadian tales like Chasse-galerie (The flying canoe) and Indigenous myths about creation and tricksters (Ravens tale, Nanabozo), have become part of the lexicon of Canadians. Fictional Canadians such as Big Joe Mufferaw, Johnny Canuck, Captain Canuck, Anne of Green Gables, and the satirical Bob and Doug McKenzie are said to represent Canadian traits.

== Surveys ==
=== Statistics Canada ===
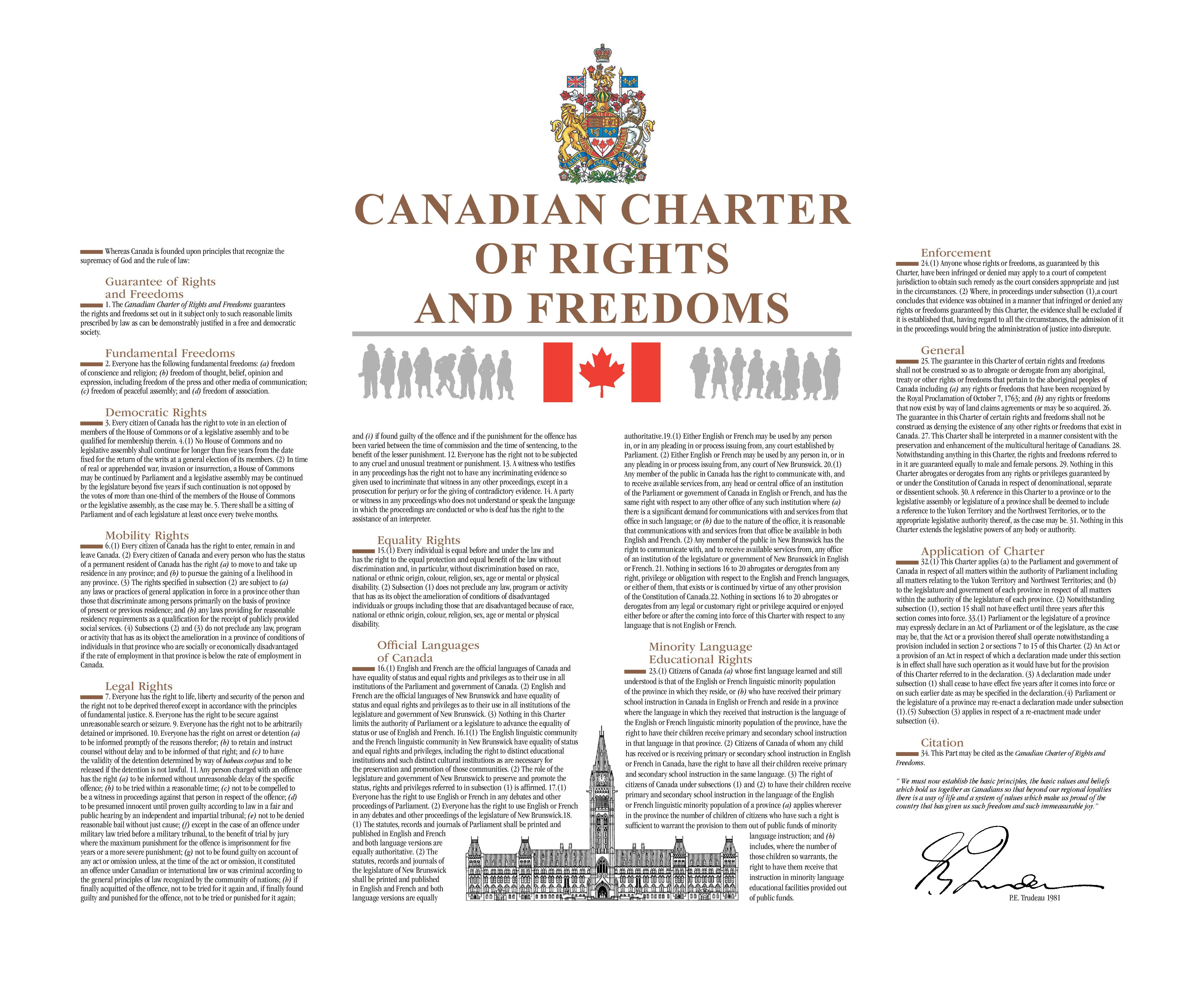
A copy of the Canadian Charter of Rights and Freedoms featuring the Arms of Canada, National flag and main building of Canadian Parliament (Centre Block)

The 2013 General Social Survey (GSS) asked Canadians about the importance of specific national symbols to the Canadian identity. Among the five symbols measured, the Charter of Rights and Freedoms and the national flag ranked the highest, with more than nine in ten Canadians stating that these symbols were either very or somewhat important to the national identity. Next highest were the national anthem at 88% and the RCMP at 87%. Ranking the lowest, but still garnering majority support, was hockey, with 77% of Canadians believing that it was an important national symbol.

For most national symbols, more than half of Canadians aged 15 years and older believed they were very important to the national identity, particularly in reference to the Charter (70%) and the flag (69%). However, less than half (46%) considered hockey - Canada’s official winter sport, as a very important symbol, with about one in five (22%) believing that it was not very important or not at all important. This contrasts feelings about the Charter and flag, where less than one in ten carried the same beliefs (4% and 9%, respectively).

When asked if there were any other symbols of national importance, Canadians offered a range of responses. Among the most commonly cited were the beaver as the national animal (16%), the maple leaf (14%) and the values and qualities of Canadian people (11%).

=== Ipsos-Reid ===
Canadians identify wilderness (83%), the flag (81%), the national anthem (74%), and hockey (73%) as the symbols that best reflect what Canada truly is", according to a 2012 Ipsos Reid poll. The 2008 Ipsos-Reid poll indicated that the maple leaf was the primary item that defines Canada, followed by ice hockey, the national flag, the beaver, the Canadarm, Canada Day, and Canadian Forces peacekeeping.

== Official and de facto symbols ==
The following is a list of official and de facto symbols, as recognized by the government of Canada. They are not shown in any order of precedence.

Symbol	Image	Notes
National flag		Official symbol as of February 15, 1965
Royal Arms of Canada		Official and Royal symbol as of November 21, 1921.
Sovereign's Flag for Canada		Royal symbol adopted in 1962
Governor General's flag		Viceregal symbol adopted in 1981
Royal Union Flag		Affirmed by parliament as a national symbol on December; 18, 1964
Canadian Royal Crown		Royal symbol approved in April 2023 by King Charles III on the advice of the Prime Minister of Canada
Royal cypher		Royal symbol since 2022
Canada wordmark		The global identifier of the Government of Canada since 1980
Corporate signatures		First implemented in 1987
International assistance		Used to identify involved in Canada’s international assistance since 2021
Great Seal		De facto symbol since 1867 (current design since June; 2025)
National anthem	"O Canada"	Official since July 1, 1980 (song dates back to 1880)
Royal anthem	"God Save the King"	De facto royal anthem that dates back to 1745
Motto	A Mari Usque Ad Mare (From sea to sea)	Officially adopted on November 21, 1921
National colours	Red #ff0000 White #FFFFFF	De facto symbol that dates back to George Stanley's rationale in the design of the Flag of Canada adopted February 15, 1965, or to an order of King George V dated November 21, 1921, or to the creation of Queen Elizabeth II's standard in 1961
National tree	Sugar maple	Official symbol since 1996
Additional national symbol	Maple leaf	De facto symbol since the 1700s
National animals	North American beaver	Official symbol since 1975
National animals	Canadian horse	Official symbol since 2002
National sport	Lacrosse (summer)	Officially adopted on May 12, 1994
National sport	Ice hockey (winter)	Officially adopted on May 12, 1994
National tartan	Maple leaf tartan	Officially adopted on March 9, 2011
Royal Canadian Mounted Police		De facto symbol since 1920
Parliament Hill		De facto symbol; built between 1859 and 1927

== See also ==
Symbols by provinces and territories
- Canadian patriotic music
- Canadian values
- Events of National Historic Significance
- List of Canadian awards
- List of Canadian flags
- National Historic Sites of Canada
- Persons of National Historic Significance
