= Coat of arms of Quebec City =

Coat of Arms of Quebec City
- Armiger: Quebec City, Quebec
- Adopted: 1949
- Crest: A crown crenellated gold mural of six pieces these, open so many doors Gules and masoned Azure;
- Shield: Azure, on a base barry wavy Argent and Azure an ancient ship under full sail Or, on a chief Gules fimbriated Or two keys in saltire Or surmounted by a maple leaf Vert;
- Motto: Don de Dieu Feray Valoir (Middle French for 'I shall put God's gift to good use')
- Designer: Maurice Brodeur

The coat of arms Quebec city is the heraldic symbol representing the city of Quebec City.

It was granted on September 22, 1988 by the Canadian Heraldric Authority, making it the first coat of arms to do so.

== Symbolism ==
The boat evokes the founding of Quebec City in 1608 by explorer Samuel de Champlain coming from Honfleur, a commune in France. It points to the maritime history of the city as well, whose historic figures (explorer Jacques Cartier and founder Samuel de Champlain) were both French navigators. Furthermore, it symbolizes the Quebec City which was one of the world's major shipbuilding spots in the mid-nineteenth century.

The key on the right symbolizes Quebec City, which was the capital of New France, Canada while the British Regime, and Lower Canada. The one on the right represents the Quebec City, capital of Quebec since Confederation.

The maple leaf represents Quebec City as a Canadian city as well as its ethnic makeup.

The mural crown at the top evokes the fortifications around Quebec City just like Saintonge, France which is the birthplace of Samuel de Champlain, the city's founder.

The motto "Don de Dieu Feray Valoir" (I shall put God to good use) points to Christian faith, symbolising the moral, social and spiritual values of Quebec City's residents.

== Blazon ==
Arms: Azure, on a base barry wavy Argent and Azure an ancient ship under full sail Or, on a chief Gules fimbriated Or two keys in saltire Or surmounted by a maple leaf Vert;

Crest: A crown crenellated gold mural of six pieces these, open so many doors Gules and masoned Azure;

== Former seal ==
Former Seal of Quebec City (1833-1949)

The former seal is a goddess sitting on the foot of Cap Diamant holding a abundance corn and a shield having a red British lion. Next to her is a bee hive and a beaver. In front of her is a ship sailing on the St. Lawrence River. Far away is the silhouette of the Laurentides. The motto is ″Natura Fortis Industria Crescit″ (It owes its power to nature and its growth to work). At the bottom of it all is written, still in latin, ″Condita Quebeccense A.D. MDCVIII - Civitatis Regimine Donata A.D. MDCCCXXXIII″. The heraldists who designed the coat of arms which are used today thought that this much detail may be hard to comprehend. To make the redesign, a committee for coat of arms was created in 1946.
