= Flag of Canada =

National Flag of Canada
- The Maple Leaf; l'Unifolié (French)
- Use: National flag, civil and state ensign
- Proportion: 1∶2
- Adopted: February 15, 1965; 61 years ago
- Design: A vertical triband of red (hoist-side and fly-side) and white (double width) with one red maple leaf centred on the white band.
- Designed by: George F. G. Stanley
- Brighter red

The national flag of Canada, (Note: French: Drapeau national du Canada) popularly referred to as the Maple Leaf, (Note: l'Unifolié (lit. 'the one-leafed')) consists of a red field with a white square at its centre in the horizontal ratio of 1∶2∶1, in which is featured one stylized, red, 11-pointed maple leaf charged in the centre. It is the first flag to have been adopted by both houses of Parliament and officially proclaimed by the Canadian monarch as the country's official national flag. The flag has become the predominant and most recognizable national symbol of Canada.

In 1964, Prime Minister Lester B. Pearson formed a committee to resolve the ongoing issue of the lack of an official Canadian flag, sparking a debate about a flag change to replace the Union Flag. Out of three choices, the maple leaf design by Mount Allison University historian George Stanley, based on the flag of the Royal Military College of Canada, was selected. The flag officially appeared on February 15, 1965; the date is now celebrated annually as National Flag of Canada Day.

Before 1965, the Canadian Red Ensign had been in unofficial use since the 1860s and was later officially approved by a 1945 Order in Council for use "wherever place or occasion may make it desirable to fly a distinctive Canadian flag". Also, the Royal Union Flag remains an official flag in Canada, to symbolize Canada's allegiance to the monarch and membership in the Commonwealth of Nations. There is no law dictating how the national flag is to be treated, but there are conventions and protocols to guide how it is to be displayed and its place in the order of precedence of flags, which gives it primacy over the aforementioned and most other flags.

Many different flags created by Canadian officials, government bodies, and military forces contain the maple leaf motif in some fashion, either by having the Canadian flag charged in the canton or by including maple leaves in the design. The Canadian flag also appears on the government's wordmark.

== Origins and design ==
Construction sheet for the national flag of Canada

The flag is horizontally symmetric, so the obverse and reverse sides appear identical. The width of the Maple Leaf flag is twice the height. The white field is a Canadian pale (a central band occupying half the width of a vertical triband flag, rather than a third of the width, named for its use in this flag); each bordering red field is exactly half its size and it bears a stylized red maple leaf at its centre. In heraldic terminology, the flag's blazon as outlined on the original royal proclamation is "gules on a Canadian pale argent a maple leaf of the first". (Note: The flag was later registered with the Canadian Heraldic Authority on March 15, 2005 as "Gules on a Canadian pale Argent a maple leaf Gules".)

The maple leaf has been a Canadian emblem since the 19th century. It was first used as a national symbol in 1868 when it appeared on the coat of arms of both Ontario and Quebec. In 1867, Alexander Muir composed the patriotic song "The Maple Leaf Forever", which became an unofficial anthem in English-speaking Canada. The maple leaf was later added to the Canadian coat of arms in 1921. From 1876 until 1901, the leaf appeared on all Canadian coins and remained on the penny after 1901. The use of the maple leaf by the 100th (Prince of Wales's Royal Canadian) Regiment of Foot as a regimental symbol extended back to 1860. During the First and Second World Wars, badges of the Canadian forces were often based on a maple leaf design. The maple leaf would eventually adorn the tombstones of Canadian military graves.

Arms of Ontario

Arms of Quebec

Maple leaves have been used on the arms of Ontario and Quebec since 1868.

By proclaiming the Royal Arms of Canada, King George V in 1921 made red and white the official colours of Canada; the former came from Saint George's Cross and the latter from the French royal emblem since King Charles VII. These colours became "entrenched" as the national colours of Canada upon the proclamation of the Queen's personal Canadian flag in 1962. The Department of Canadian Heritage has listed the various colour shades for printing ink that should be used when reproducing the Canadian flag; these include:

- FIP red: General Printing Ink, No. 0-712;
- Inmont Canada Ltd., No. 4T51577;
- Monarch Inks, No. 62539/0
- Rieger Inks, No. 25564
- Sinclair and Valentine, No. RL163929/0.

The number of points on the leaf has no special significance; the number and arrangement of the points were chosen after wind tunnel tests showed the current design to be the least blurry of the various designs when tested under high-wind conditions.

The image of the maple leaf used on the flag was designed by Jacques Saint-Cyr; Jack Cook claims that this stylized eleven-point maple leaf was lifted from a copyrighted design owned by a Canadian craft shop in Ottawa. The colours 0/100/100/0 in the CMYK process, PMS 032 (flag red 100%), or PMS 485 (used for screens) in the Pantone colour specifier can be used when reproducing the flag. For the Federal Identity Program, the red tone of the standard flag has an RGB value of 255–0–0 (web hexadecimal #FF0000). In 1984, the National Flag of Canada Manufacturing Standards Act was passed to unify the manufacturing standards for flags used in both indoor and outdoor conditions.

Scheme	Red	White
Pantone (Paper)	032 C	White
Web colours	#EF3340	#FFFFFF
RGB	239, 51, 64	255, 255, 255
CMYK	0%, 79%, 73%, 6%	0%, 0%, 0%, 0%

The flag of Canada is represented as the Unicode emoji sequence U+1F1E8 🇨 REGIONAL INDICATOR SYMBOL LETTER C, U+1F1E6 🇦 REGIONAL INDICATOR SYMBOL LETTER A: 🇨🇦.

== History ==
=== Early flags ===
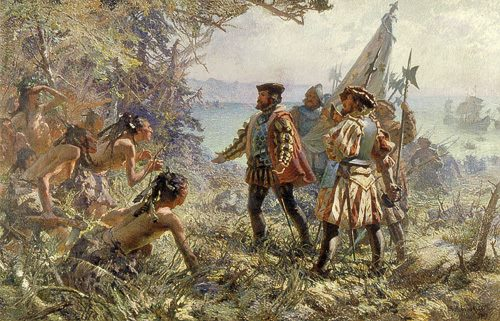
Depiction of Jacques Cartier meeting with Iroquoians at Stadacona. Another member of Cartier's party is holding the royal banner of France.

The Saint George's Cross was carried by John Cabot when he reached the later-named Newfoundland in 1497. In 1534, Jacques Cartier planted a cross in Gaspé bearing the French royal coat of arms with the fleurs-de-lis. The Royal Banner of France or "Bourbon Flag" held a position of some prominence in New France, with the evolving variations of French military flags being used over time.

The United Empire Loyalist flag, which is similar to the flag of Great Britain, but in a 1:2 ratio. The flag is still used in loyalist settlements within Canada.

As the de facto British national flag, the Union Flag (commonly known as the "Union Jack") was used similarly in Canada from the time of British settlement in Nova Scotia after 1621. Its use continued after Canada's legislative independence from the United Kingdom in 1931 until the adoption of the current flag in 1965. The United Empire Loyalist flag, that is very similar to the Union Jack, was used by immigrants who remained loyal to the British crown during the American Revolutionary War. In present-day Canada, the United Empire Loyalist flag continues to be used as symbol of pride and heritage for loyalist townships and organizations.

Shortly after Canadian Confederation in 1867, the need for distinctive Canadian flags emerged. The first Canadian flag was then used as the flag of the governor general of Canada, a Union Flag with a shield in the centre bearing the quartered arms of Ontario, Quebec, Nova Scotia, and New Brunswick, surrounded by a wreath of maple leaves. In 1870, the Red Ensign, with the addition of the Canadian composite shield in the fly, began to be used unofficially on land and sea and was known as the Canadian Red Ensign. As new provinces joined the Confederation, their arms were added to the shield. In 1892, the British admiralty approved the use of the Red Ensign for Canadian use at sea.

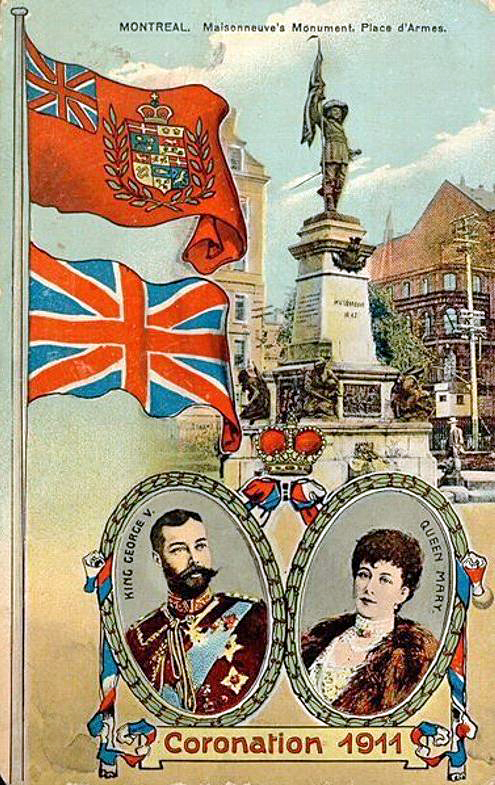
A Canadian postcard marking the coronation of King George V and Queen Mary in 1911, depicting a Canadian Red Ensign with a crowned composite shield of Canada in the fly, and the Union Flag below it

The composite shield was replaced with the coat of arms of Canada upon its grant in 1921, and in 1924, an Order in Council approved its use for Canadian government buildings abroad. In 1925, Prime Minister William Lyon Mackenzie King established a committee to design a flag to be used at home, but it was dissolved before the final report could be delivered. Despite the failure of the committee to solve the issue, public sentiment in the 1920s was in favour of fixing the flag problem for Canada. New designs were proposed in 1927, 1931, and 1939.

By the Second World War, the Red Ensign was viewed as Canada's de facto national flag. A joint committee of the Senate and House of Commons was appointed on November 8, 1945, to recommend a national flag to officially adopt. It received 2,409 designs from the public and was addressed by the director of the Historical Section of the Canadian Army, Archer Fortescue Duguid, who pointed out that red and white were Canada's official colours and there was already an emblem representing the country: three joined maple leaves seen on the escutcheon of the Canadian coat of arms. By May 9 the following year, the committee reported back with a recommendation "that the national flag of Canada should be the Canadian red ensign with a maple leaf in autumn golden colours in a bordered background of white". The Legislative Assembly of Quebec had urged the committee not to include any of what it deemed as "foreign symbols", including the Union Flag, and Mackenzie King, then still prime minister, declined to act on the report; fearing it may lead to political instability. As a result, the Union Flag was kept as a national flag, and the order to fly the Canadian Red Ensign at government buildings was maintained.

=== Great Flag Debate ===
The Canadian Red Ensign, as used up to the Great Flag Debate

By the 1960s, the debate for an official Canadian flag intensified and became controversial, culminating in the Great Flag Debate of 1964. In 1963, the minority Liberal government of Lester B. Pearson gained power and decided to adopt a flag through parliamentary debate. The principal political proponent of the change was Pearson. He had been a significant broker during the Suez Crisis of 1956, for which he was awarded the Nobel Peace Prize. During the crisis, Pearson was disturbed when the Egyptian government objected to Canadian peacekeeping forces because the Canadian flag (the Red Ensign) contained the same symbol (the Union Flag) also used by the United Kingdom, one of the belligerents. Pearson's goal was to create a flag that was distinctive and unmistakably Canadian. The main opponent to changing the flag was John Diefenbaker, leader of the opposition and former prime minister, who eventually made the subject a personal crusade.

A flag design created by Alan Beddoe, and dubbed the Pearson Pennant, being Prime Minister Lester B. Pearson's favoured design

In 1961, when Leader of the Opposition, Pearson asked John Ross Matheson, a fellow Liberal MP, to begin researching what it would take for Canada to have a new flag. By April 1963, Pearson was prime minister in a minority government and risked losing power over the issue. He formed a 15-member multi-party parliamentary committee in 1963 to select a new design, despite opposition leader Diefenbaker's demands for a referendum on the issue. On May 27, 1964, Pearson's cabinet introduced a motion to parliament for the adoption of his favourite design, presented to him by Alan Beddoe, an artist and heraldic advisor, of a "sea to sea" (Canada's motto) flag with blue borders and three conjoined red maple leaves on a white field. This motion led to weeks of acrimonious debate in the House of Commons, and the design came to be known as the "Pearson Pennant", derided by the media and viewed as a "concession to Quebec".

Flag design created by George Stanley and selected by the parliamentary committee

A new all-party committee was formed in September 1964, comprising seven Liberals, five Conservatives, one New Democrat, one Social Crediter, and one Créditiste, with Herman Batten as chairman, while John Matheson acted as Pearson's right-hand man. Among those who gave their opinions to the group was Duguid, expressing the same views as he had in 1945, insisting on a design using three maple leaves; Arthur R. M. Lower, stressing the need for a distinctly Canadian emblem; Marcel Trudel, arguing for symbols of Canada's founding nations, which did not include the maple leaf (a thought shared by Diefenbaker); and A. Y. Jackson, providing his own suggested designs. A steering committee also considered about 2,000 suggestions from the public, in addition to 3,900 others that included, according to Library and Archives Canada, "those that had accumulated in the Department of the Secretary of State and those from a parliamentary flag committee of 1945–1946". Through six weeks of study with political manoeuvring, the committee took a vote on the two finalists: the Pearson Pennant (Beddoe's design) and the current design. Believing the Liberal members would vote for the prime minister's preference, the Conservatives voted for the single-leaf design. The Liberals, though, all voted for the single-leaf design, as did the members from the other two parties, giving a unanimous 15 to 0 vote for the option created by George Stanley and inspired by the flag of the Royal Military College of Canada (RMC) in Kingston, Ontario.

Flag of the Royal Military College of Canada

There, near the parade square, in March 1964, while viewing the college flag atop the Mackenzie Building, Stanley, RMC's Dean of Arts, first suggested to Matheson that the RMC flag should form the basis of the national flag. The suggestion was followed by Stanley's memorandum of March 23, 1964, on the history of Canada's emblems, in which he warned that any new flag "must avoid the use of national or racial symbols that are of a divisive nature" and that it would be "clearly inadvisable" to create a flag that carried the Union Flag or a fleur-de-lis. According to Matheson, Pearson's "paramount and desperate objective" in introducing the new flag was keeping Quebec in Canada. It was Stanley's idea that the new flag should be red and white and that it should feature the single maple leaf; his memorandum included the first sketch of what would become the flag of Canada. Stanley and Matheson collaborated on a design that was, after six months of debate and 308 speeches, passed by a majority vote in the House of Commons on December 15, 1964. Just after this, at 2 am, Matheson wrote to Stanley: "Your proposed flag has just now been approved by the Commons 163 to 78. Congratulations. I believe it is an excellent flag that will serve Canada well." The Senate added its approval two days later.

=== Proclamation ===
After the resolutions proposing a new national flag for Canada were passed by the two houses of parliament, a proclamation was drawn up for signature by the Queen of Canada. This was created in the form of an illuminated document on vellum, with calligraphy by Yvonne Diceman and heraldic illustrations. The text was rendered in black ink, using a quill, while the heraldic elements were painted in gouache with gilt highlights. The Great Seal of Canada was embossed and secured by a silk ribbon.

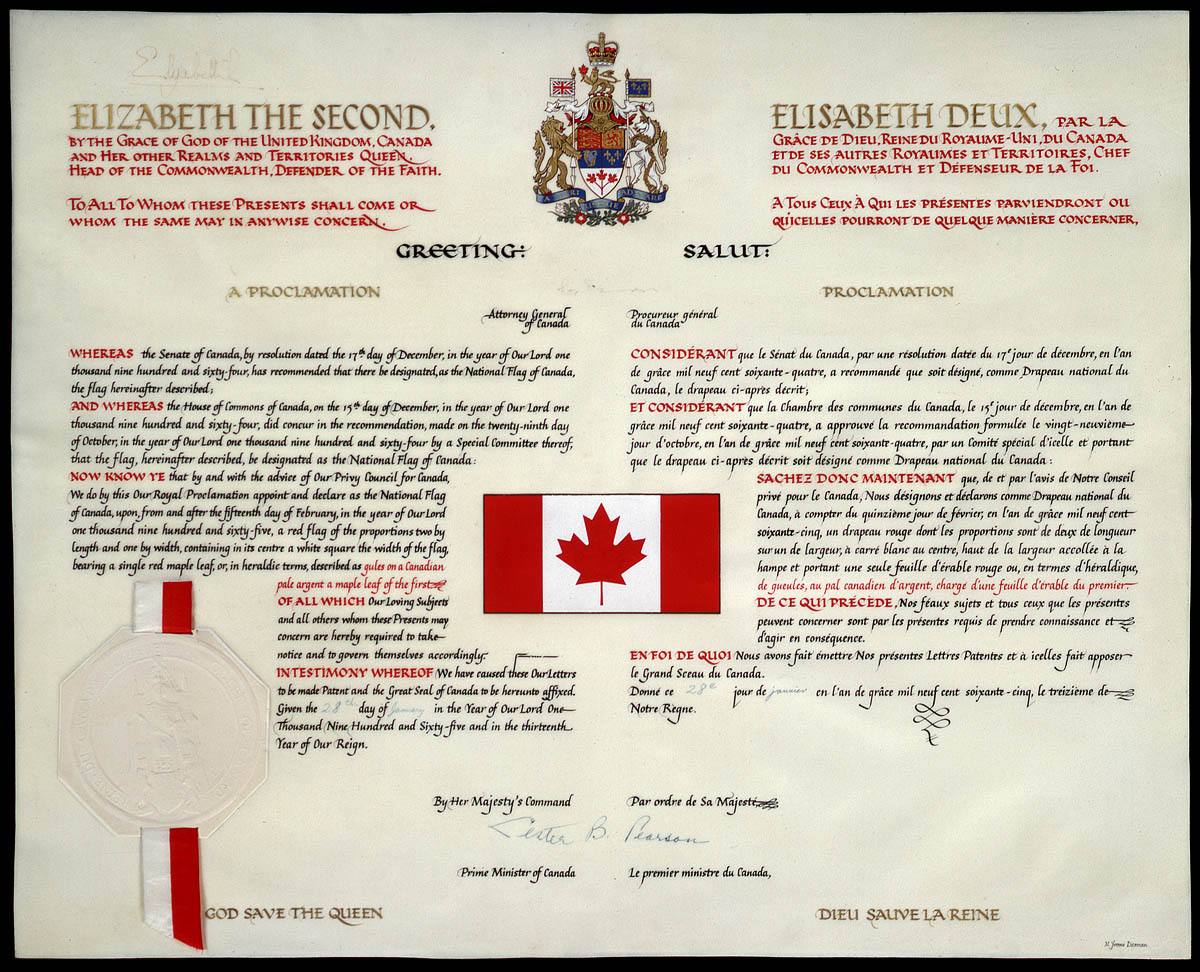
Royal proclamation of the national flag of Canada, featuring the coat of arms, national colours ribbon and wax great seal imprint

This parchment was signed discreetly by the calligrapher but was made official by the signatures of Queen Elizabeth II (given on January 28, 1965), Prime Minister Lester Pearson, and Attorney General Guy Favreau. In order to obtain these signatures, the document was flown to the United Kingdom (for the Queen's royal sign-manual) and to the Caribbean (for the signature of Favreau, who was on vacation). This transport to different climates, combined with the quality of the materials with which the proclamation was created and the subsequent storage and repair methods (including the use of Scotch Tape), contributed to the deterioration of the document: The gouache was flaking off, leaving gaps in the heraldic designs, most conspicuously on the red maple leaf of the flag design in the centre of the sheet, and the adhesive from the tape had left stains. A desire to have the proclamation as part of a display at the Canadian Museum of Civilization marking the flag's 25th anniversary led to its restoration in 1989. The proclamation is today stored in a temperature and humidity-controlled plexiglass case to prevent the vellum from changing dimensionally.

=== Adoption ===
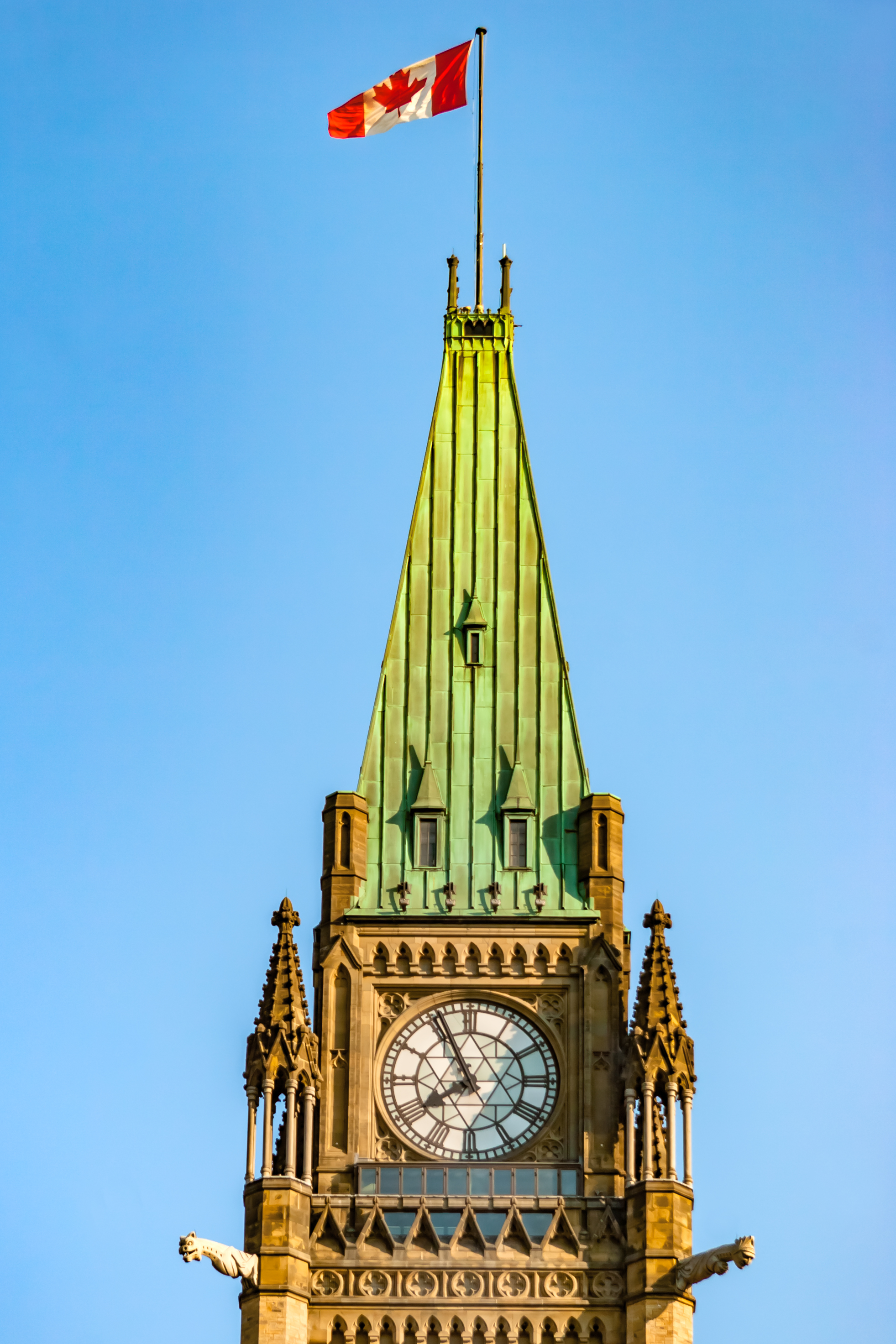
The Canadian flag flying atop the Peace Tower. An official ceremony inaugurating the flag was held on Parliament Hill in 1965.

The new national flag was inaugurated on February 15, 1965, at an official ceremony held on Parliament Hill in Ottawa, in the presence of Governor General Major-General Georges Vanier, the Prime Minister, other members of the Cabinet, and Canadian parliamentarians. The Red Ensign was lowered at the stroke of noon, and the new maple leaf flag was raised. The crowd sang "O Canada" followed by "God Save the Queen". Of the flag, Vanier said "[it] will symbolize to each of us—and to the world—the unity of purpose and high resolve to which destiny beckons us". Maurice Bourget, Speaker of the Senate, said: "The flag is the symbol of the nation's unity, for it, beyond any doubt, represents all the citizens of Canada without distinction of race, language, belief, or opinion." Yet there was still opposition to the change, and Stanley's life was even threatened for having "assassinated the flag". Despite this, Stanley attended the flag-raising ceremony.

At the time of the 50th anniversary of the flag in 2015, the government—held by the Conservative Party—was criticized for the lack of an official ceremony dedicated to the date; accusations of partisanship were levelled. Minister of Canadian Heritage Shelly Glover denied the charges, and others, including Liberal Members of Parliament, pointed to community events taking place around the country. Governor General David Johnston did, though, preside at an official ceremony at Confederation Park in Ottawa, integrated with Winterlude. He said, "[t]he National Flag of Canada is so embedded in our national life and so emblematic of our national purpose that we simply cannot imagine our country without it." Queen Elizabeth II stated: "On this, the 50th anniversary of the National Flag of Canada, I am pleased to join with all Canadians in the celebration of this unique and cherished symbol of our country and identity." A commemorative stamp and coin were issued by Canada Post and the Royal Canadian Mint, respectively.

== Alternative flags ==
=== Former flags ===
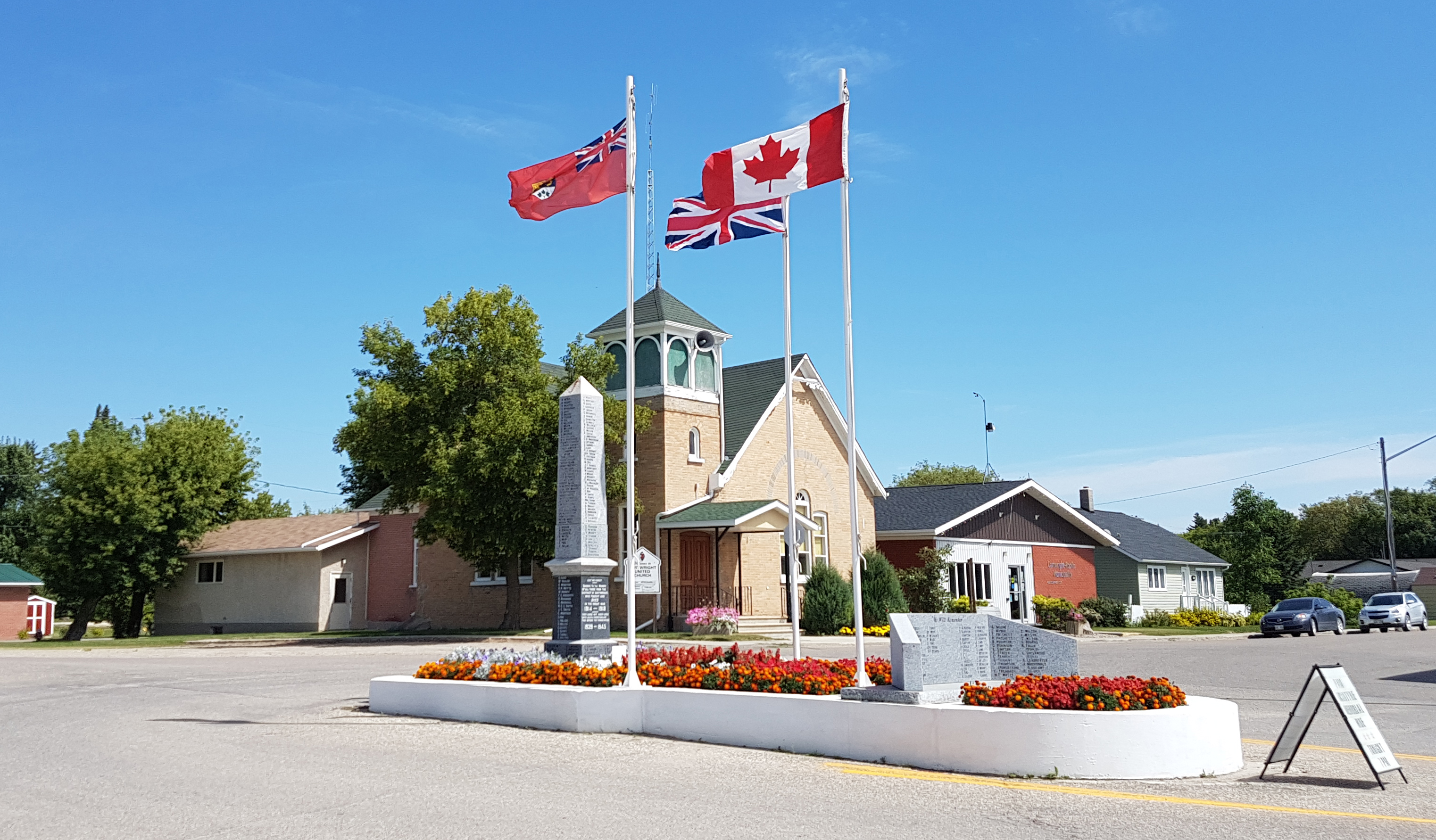
A Canadian Red Ensign, Royal Union Flag, and the flag of Canada flown next to a cenotaph in Cartwright, Manitoba

Former flags used to represent Canada continue to see limited use in Canada. The Royal Union Flag remains in use in Canada as a formal symbol of the nation's membership in the Commonwealth of Nations and allegiance to the Crown and is flown on certain occasions. Regulations require federal installations to fly the Royal Union Flag beside the national flag when physically possible, using a second flagpole, on the following days: Commonwealth Day (the second Monday in March), Victoria Day (the same date as the Canadian sovereign's official birthday), and the anniversary of the Statute of Westminster (December 11). The Royal Union Flag can also be flown at the National War Memorial or at other locations during ceremonies that honour Canadian involvement with forces of other Commonwealth nations during times of war. The national flag always precedes the Royal Union Flag, with the former occupying the place of honour.

The Royal Union Flag is also part of the provincial flags of Ontario and Manitoba, forming the canton of these flags; a stylized version is used on the flag of British Columbia and the flag of Newfoundland and Labrador. Several of the provincial lieutenant governors formerly used a modified union flag as their flags of office. The last to abolish this design was the lieutenant governor of Nova Scotia in 2024.

The Red Ensign is occasionally still used, including official use at some ceremonies. It was flown at the commemorations of the Battle of Vimy Ridge in 2007. This decision elicited criticism from those who believed it should not have been given equal status to the Canadian flag and received praise from people who believed that it was important to retain the ties to Canada's past. The Royal Union Flag and Red Ensign are still flown in Canada by veterans' groups and others who continue to stress the importance of Canada's British heritage and the Commonwealth connection.

=== Sovereign's Flag ===
Sovereign's Flag for Canada

The Sovereign's Flag for Canada derives its design from the coat of arms of Canada, constituting a banner of arms. However the Sovereign's Flag is formally used to represent the presence of the Canadian sovereign, rather than serve as a national flag.

=== Flags of nations in Canada ===
In Quebec, the provincial flag (a white cross on a field of blue with four fleurs-de-lis) can be considered a national flag along with the Maple Leaf flag, as is the Acadian flag in the Acadian regions of the Maritime provinces. Public display of Canadian flags is rare in Quebec, with most Quebecers preferring to fly the flag of Quebec instead. Display of the flag is also contentious, with the Quebec provincial government ordering that the Quebec flag be given seniority over the Canadian one in the province, and many Quebec government facilities, such as the Quebec City Hall, the headquarters of the Sûreté du Québec and SAAQ, and the Quebec Parliament, refusing to fly the Canadian flag at all.

Flag of Acadia

Flag of Quebec

== Protocol ==
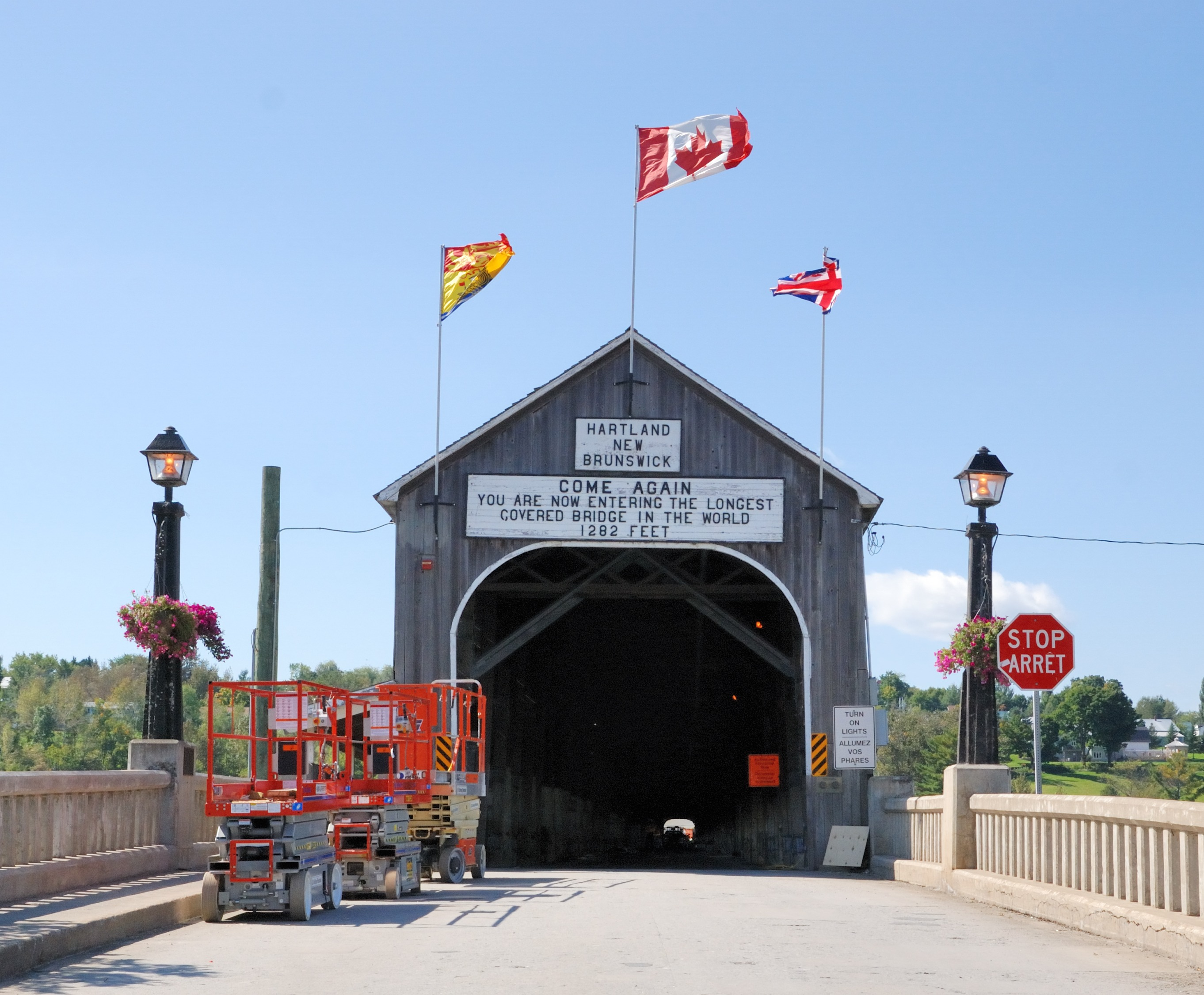
Hartland Covered Bridge, with the Canadian flag on its tallest flagpole

No law dictates the proper use of the Canadian flag. Canadian Heritage has released rules for flying the National Flag of Canada alone and with other flags. The rules deal with the order of precedence in which the Canadian flag is placed, where the flag can be used, how it is used, and what people should do to honour the flag. The suggestions, titled National Flag of Canada Etiquette, were published by Canadian Heritage online and last updated on February 24, 2022. Canadian Forces also have a unique protocol for folding the Canadian flag for presentations, such as during a funeral ceremony; CF does not recommend this method for everyday use.

The flag can be displayed on any day at buildings operated by the Government of Canada, airports, military bases, diplomatic offices, and citizens during any time of the day. When flying the flag, it should be flown using its pole and should not be inferior to other flags, save for, in descending order, the sovereign's flag for Canada, the governor general's flag, any of the personal flags of members of the Canadian Royal Family, or flags of the lieutenant governors. The Canadian flag is flown at half-mast in Canada to indicate a period of mourning.

== Promoting the flag ==
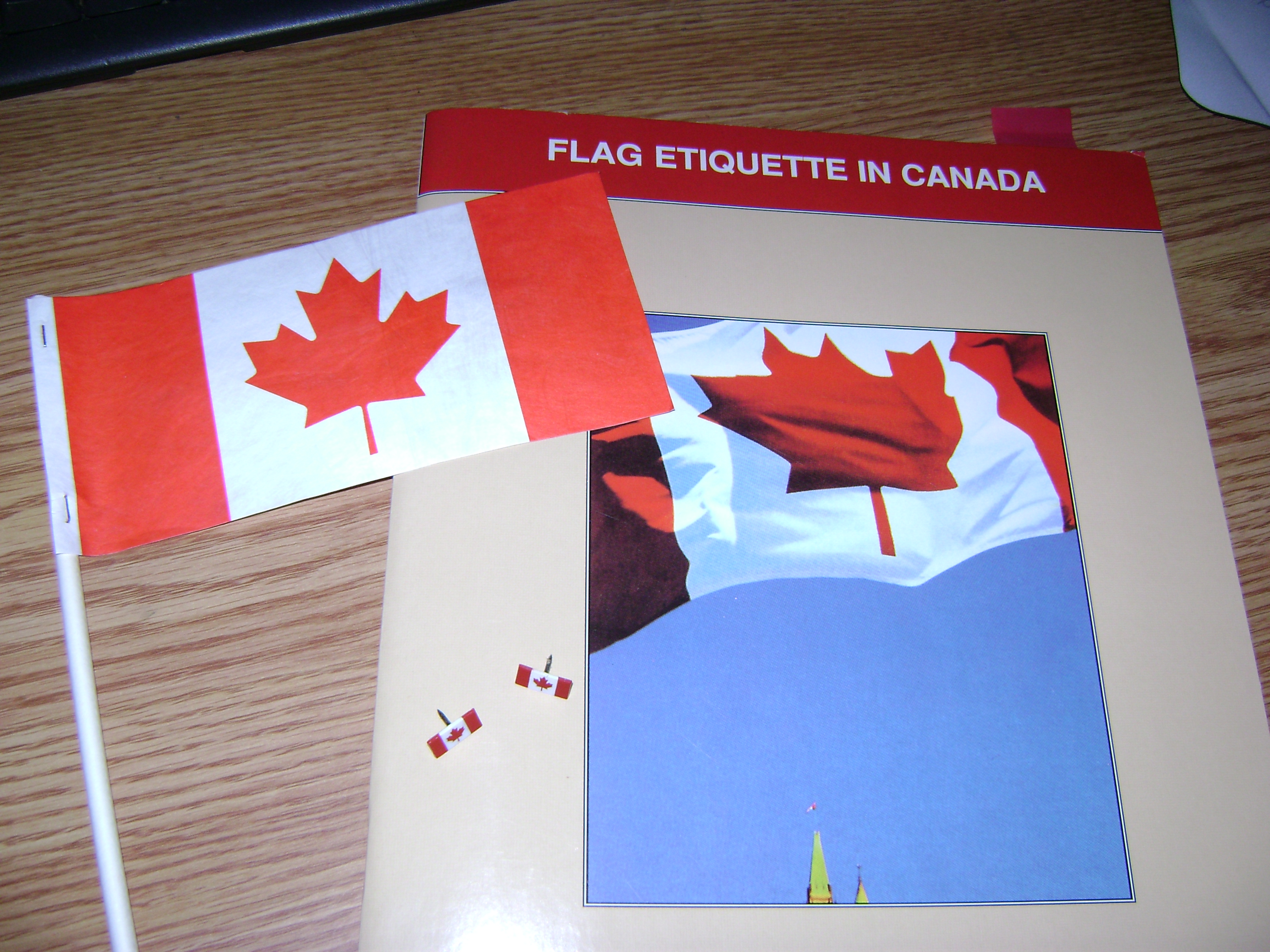
A sample of items from the Parliamentary Flag Program

Since the Canadian flag was adopted in 1965, the Canadian government has sponsored programs to promote it. Examples include the Canadian Parliamentary Flag Program of the Department of Canadian Heritage and the flag program run by the Department of Public Works. These programs increased the exposure of the flag and the concept that it was part of the national identity. To raise awareness of the new flag, the Parliamentary Flag Program was set up in December 1972 by the Cabinet and, beginning in 1973, allowed members of the House of Commons to distribute flags and lapel pins in the shape of the Canadian flag to their constituents. Full-size flags that have been flown on Peace Tower and four other locations on Parliament Hill are packaged by the Department of Public Works and offered to the public free of charge. As of March 2019, the program has a waiting list of over 100 years for both Peace Tower flags, which are 2.3 by 4.6 metres (7.5 by 15 ft) in size, and for flags from the other four locations (one on each side of Centre Block and one each over East and West Blocks), which are 1.4 by 2.7 metres (4.5 by 9 ft).

Since 1996, February 15 has been commemorated as National Flag of Canada Day. In 1996, Minister of Canadian Heritage Sheila Copps instituted the One in a Million National Flag Challenge. Canadian Heritage put the expenses at $15.5 million, with approximately a seventh of the cost offset by donations.

In February 2025, in the lead up to the 60th anniversary of the Canadian maple leaf flag, former prime ministers Kim Campbell, Jean Chrétien, Joe Clark, Stephen Harper and Paul Martin encouraged Canadians to show national pride and fly the flag "like never before" in the light of "threats and insults" against Canadian Sovereignty by United States President Donald Trump.

== See also ==
- List of Canadian flags
- List of Canadian provincial and territorial symbols

== Bibliography ==
- Archbold, Rick (2002). I Stand for Canada. Macfarlane Walter & Ross. ISBN 1-55199-108-X.
- Levine, Allan. "The Great Flag Debate". Canada's History 94#6 (2014–15): 32–37.
- Matheson, Col. John R. (1980). Canada's Flag: A Search for a Country. Mika Publishing Company. ISBN 0-919303-01-3.
- Stanley, George F. G. (1965). The Story of Canada's Flag: A Historical Sketch. Ryerson Press.
- Thompson, Hugh (2002). Canada. Dorling Kindersley. ISBN 0-7894-9561-9.
- Thorner, Thomas (2003). A Country Nourished on Self-Doubt: Documents in Post-Confederation Canadian History. Broadview Press. ISBN 1-55111-548-4.
