= Great seal =

Seal used by a head of state

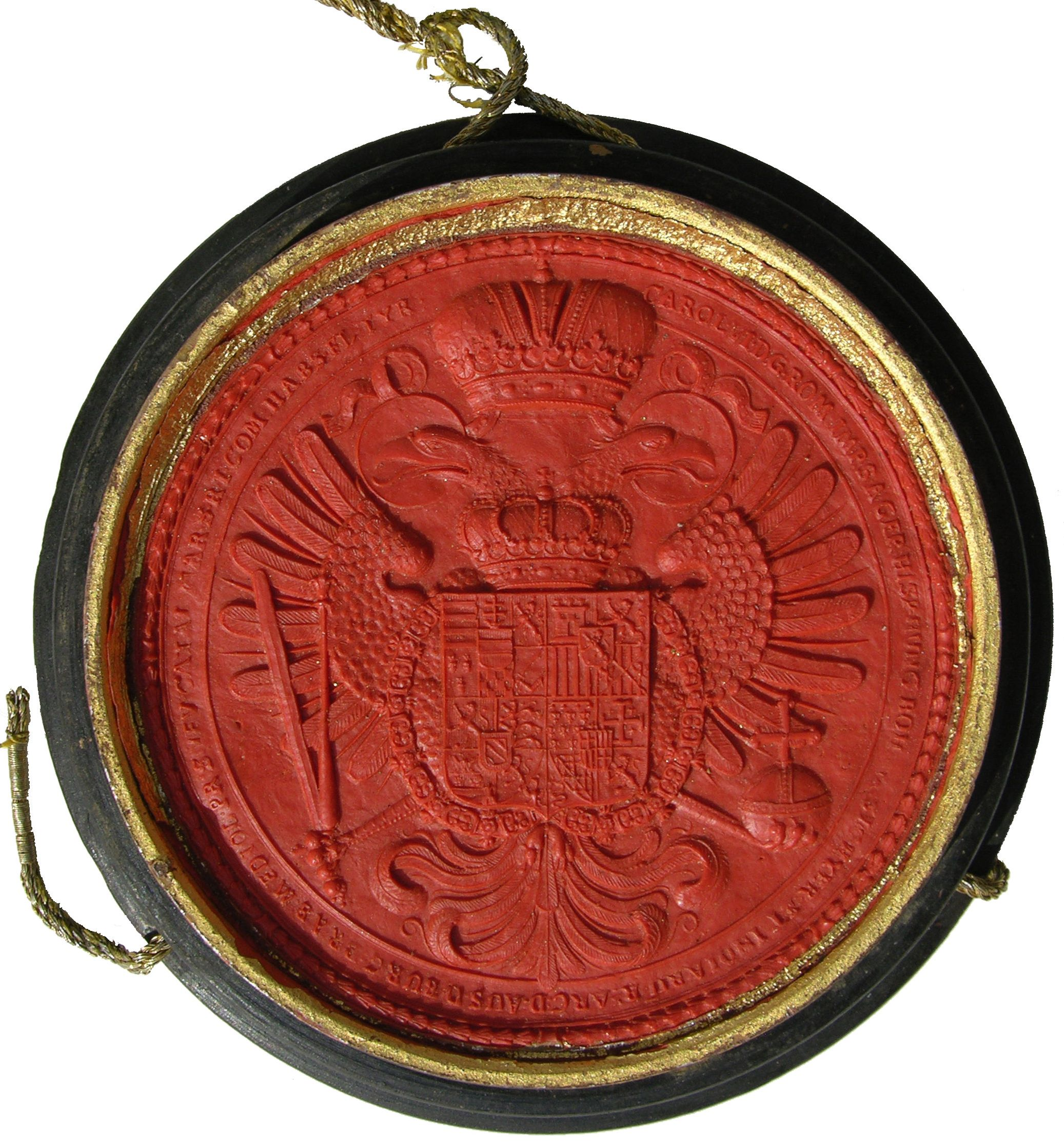
Great Seal of Charles VI, Holy Roman Emperor

A great seal is a seal used by a head of state, or someone authorised to do so on their behalf, to confirm formal documents, such as laws, treaties, appointments and letters of dispatch. It was and is used as a guarantee of the authenticity of the most important and solemn records and documents.

During the Middle Ages, the great seal played a far greater political role and there was much real power associated with having control over the seal. In addition to the great seal, a prince usually also had a privy seal, used for correspondence of a more private nature.

The seal is usually formally entrusted upon an office-holder to act as keeper of the seal. This keeper may be a separate office but was also usually combined with that of the chancellor. Nowadays, the great seal is usually entrusted upon a minister, particularly a minister of justice.

== Design ==
Great seals of republics usually show the nation's coat of arms (e.g. the Great Seal of the United States) or an allegorical image (e.g. the Great Seal of France). For this reason, the design used usually remains unchanged. The seals themselves may, however, be replaced because of wear depending on how often the seal is used. In monarchies, by contrast, the great seal is often changed some time after the accession of a new monarch as the seal often depicts the reigning monarch in full form.

== By country ==
Current countries

- Great Seal of Australia
- Great Seal of Canada
  - Great Seal of Ontario
  - Great Seal of Quebec
- Great Seal of France
- Great Seal of the State (Greece)
- Seal of the president of Ireland
- Seal of New Zealand
- Great Seal of the Realm (United Kingdom)
  - Great Seal of Northern Ireland
  - Great Seal of Scotland
  - Welsh Seal
- Great Seal of the State (Peru)
- Great Seal of the Philippines
- Great Seal of the United States
- National Seal of the Republic of Korea
- National Seals of the Republic of China
- National seals of Japan

Historic seals

- Great Seal of the Commonwealth (1655)
- Seal of the Confederate States
- Public Seal of Hong Kong, the official seal prior to the transfer of sovereignty of Hong Kong
- Great Seal of the Irish Free State
- Great Seal of the Netherlands
- The Seal of Solomon is often referred to as the Great Seal
- The Heirloom Seal of the Realm
