= Keeper of the Great Seal =

Keeper of the Great Seal can refer to:

- Keeper of the Great Seal of Canada
- Keeper of the Great Seal of Scotland
- Keeper of the Great Seal of the State of Illinois
- Keeper of the Great Seal of Wisconsin
- Lord Keeper of the Great Seal of England

== See also ==
- Keeper of the Seals, France
- Keeper of the Privy Seal of Scotland
- Great Officer of State
