= Order of Ontario =

Civilian honour for merit in Canada

- Insignia of the Order of Ontario

Awarded by the lieutenant governor of Ontario
- Type: Order of merit (provincial)
- Established: 1986
- Eligibility: All present or former long-term residents of Ontario who are not elected representatives in government
- Awarded for: Demonstrations of excellence in any field or outstanding contributions to society in Ontario and elsewhere
- Status: Currently constituted
- Founder: Lincoln Alexander representing Elizabeth II
- Chancellor: Edith Dumont
- Grades: Member
- Post-nominals: OOnt

Statistics
- First induction: 1987
- Total inductees: 903

Precedence
- Next (higher): Saskatchewan Order of Merit
- Next (lower): Order of British Columbia
- Ribbon bar of the order

The Order of Ontario (French: Ordre de l'Ontario) is a civilian honour for merit in the Canadian province of Ontario. Instituted in 1986 by Lieutenant Governor Lincoln Alexander, on the advice of the Cabinet under Premier David Peterson, the civilian order is administered by the Lieutenant Governor-in-Council and is intended to honour current or former Ontario residents for conspicuous achievements in any field.

== Structure and appointment ==
The Order of Ontario is intended to honour any current or former longtime resident of Ontario who has demonstrated a high level of individual excellence and achievement in any field, demonstrating "the best of Ontario's caring and diverse society and [whose] lives have benefited society in Ontario and elsewhere." Canadian citizenship is not a requirement and elected or appointed members of a governmental body are ineligible as long as they hold office. There are no limits on how many can belong to the order or be invested at one time, though the average number of new members stands at 24 per year.

The process of finding qualified individuals begins with submissions from the public to the Ontario Honours and Awards Secretariat, which consists of the Chief Justice of Ontario (who serves as the chairperson), the Speaker of the Legislative Assembly, the Secretary of the Cabinet, and up to six members of the Order of Ontario. This committee then meets once or twice yearly to make its selected recommendations to the Cabinet and works with that body in narrowing down the potential appointees to a list that will be submitted to the lieutenant governor. Since appointments to the Order of Ontario rely in part on ministerial advice, records of such proceedings are not publicly revealed, as affirmed in court proceedings undertaken in 2002 by an individual who had been mistakenly informed that she had been appointed to the order. Posthumous nominations are not accepted, though an individual who dies after their name was submitted to the Honours and Awards Secretariat can still be retroactively made a Member of the Order of Ontario. The lieutenant governor, ex officio a member and the Chancellor of the Order of Ontario, then makes all appointments into the fellowship's single grade of membership by an Order in Council that bears the viceroyal sign-manual; thereafter, the new members are entitled to use the post-nominal letters OOnt.

== Insignia ==
Upon admission into the Order of Ontario, new members are presented with the order's insignia. The main badge consists of a gold medallion in the form of a stylized trillium, the official provincial flower. The obverse is white enamel with gold edging, bearing at its centre the escutcheon of the arms of Ontario, all surmounted by a St Edward's Crown symbolizing the Canadian monarch's role as the fount of honour. The name of the member is engraved on the reverse, along with the date of their investiture. The order's ribbon is patterned with vertical stripes in red, green, white, and gold, reflecting the colours within the provincial coat of arms. The insignia is worn suspended from this ribbon at the collar; women may carry theirs on a ribbon bow at the left chest. Members also receive two lapel pins that can be worn during less formal occasions, and an official certificate.

To mark the 30th anniversary of the first investiture of the Order of Ontario, a collar featuring the insignia of the order and symbols of Canada and Ontario was unveiled for the use of the Lieutenant Governor as Chancellor of the Order of Ontario.

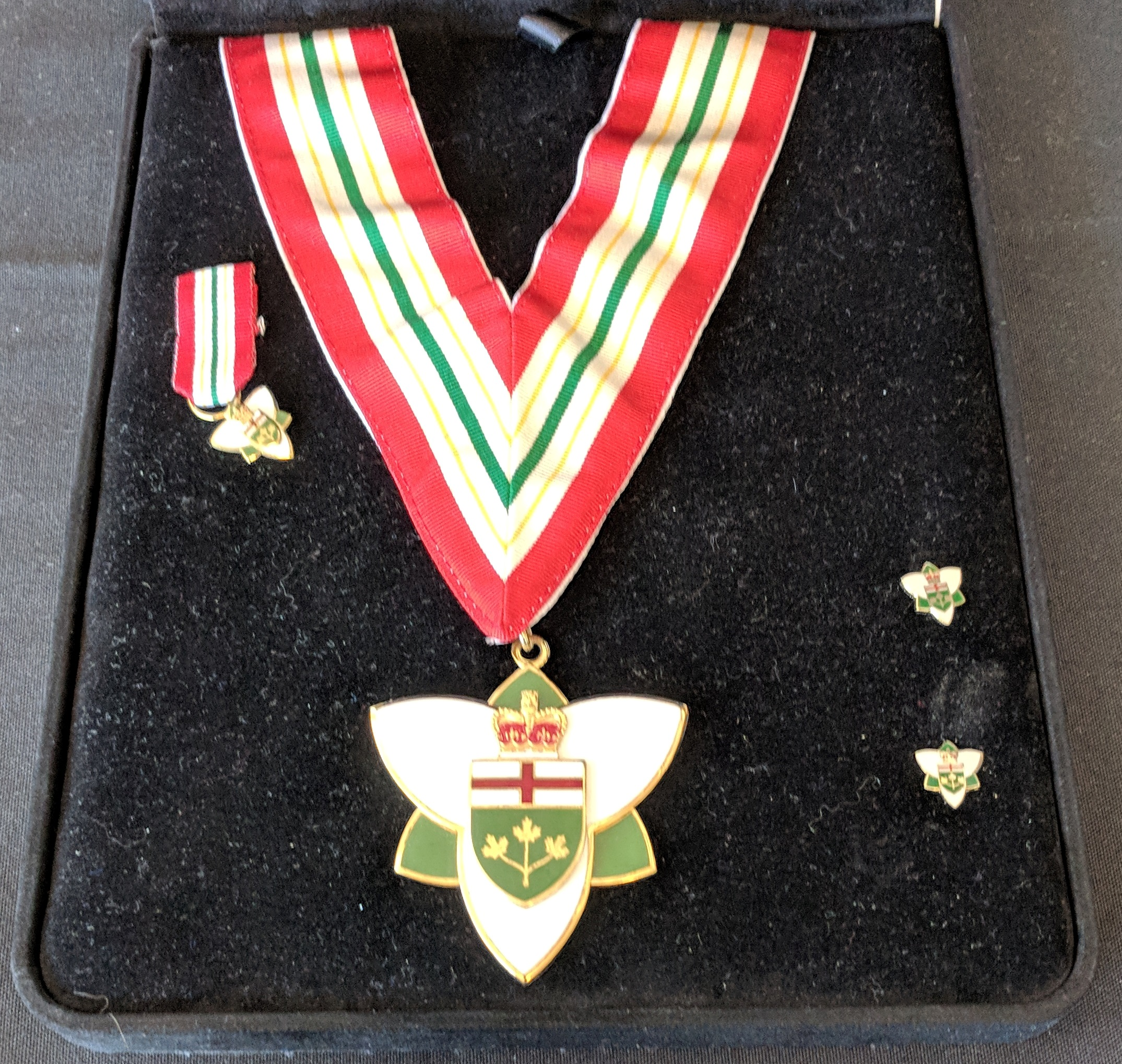
The full-size insignia, along with a miniature medal and lapel pins

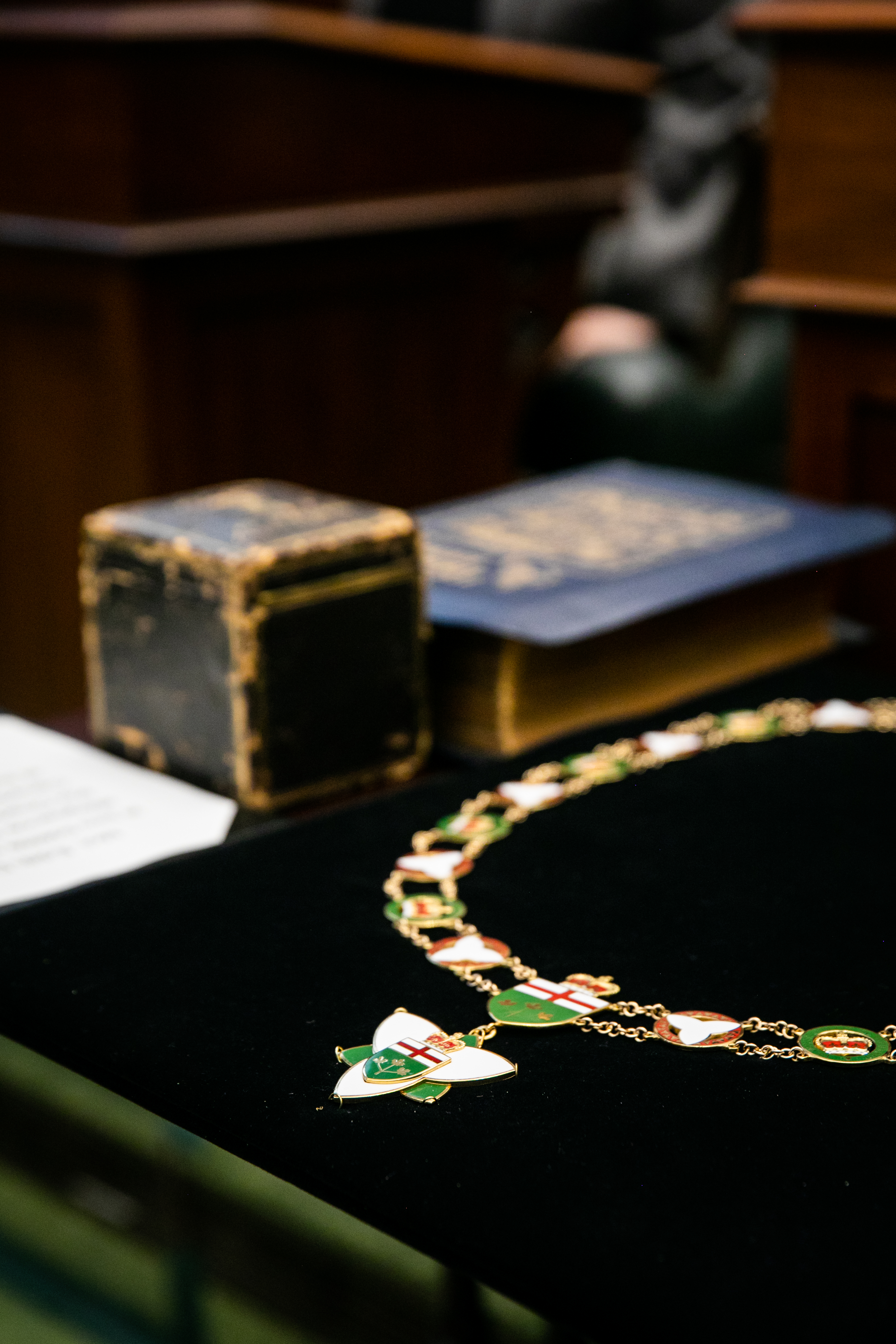
The chancellor's collar, first unveiled for the order's 30th anniversary

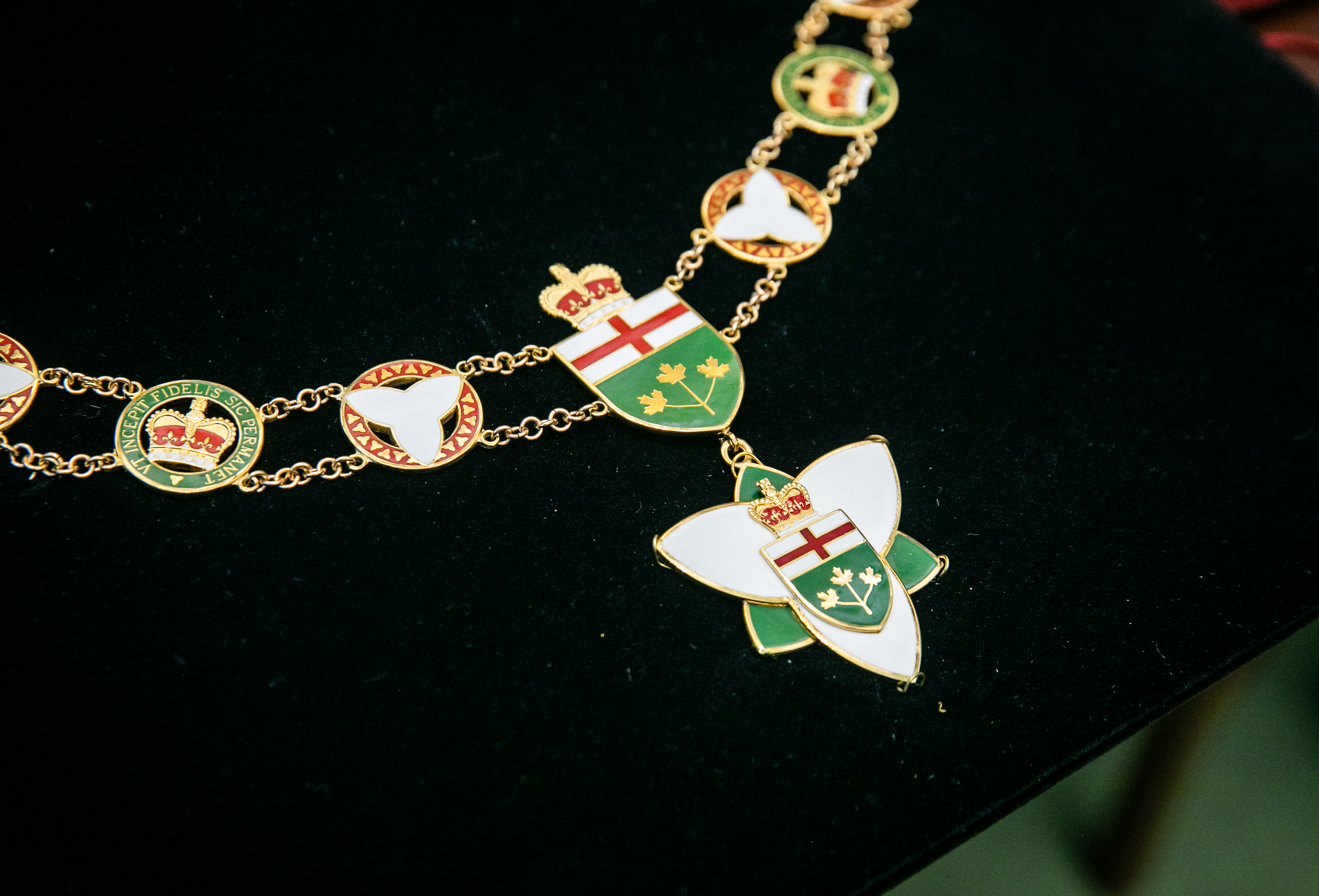
A close-up view of the chancellor's collar

== See also ==
- Symbols of Ontario
- Orders, decorations, and medals of the Canadian provinces
- Canadian honours order of wearing
