= Great Seal of Ontario =

Canadian provincial governmental seal

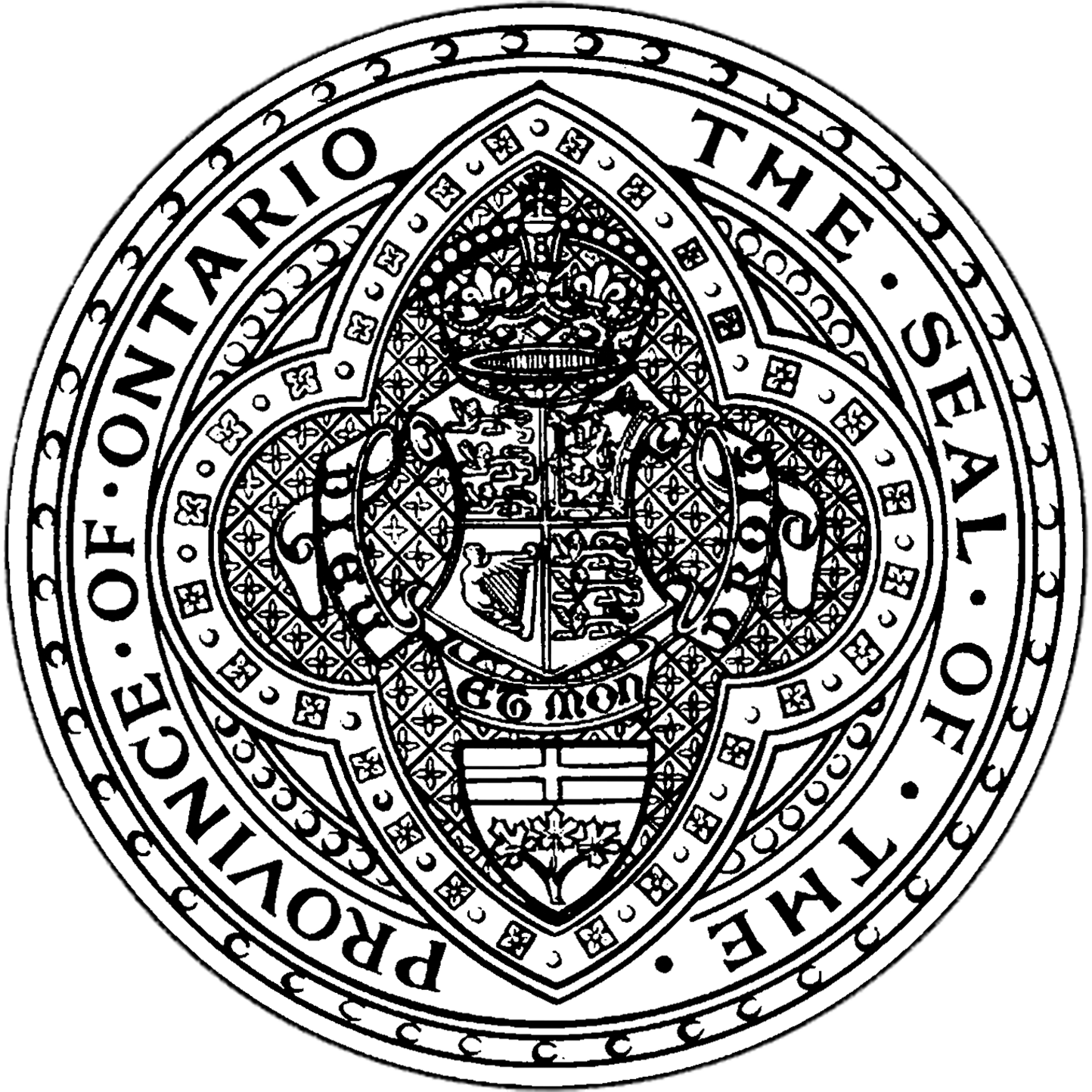
The Great Seal of Ontario

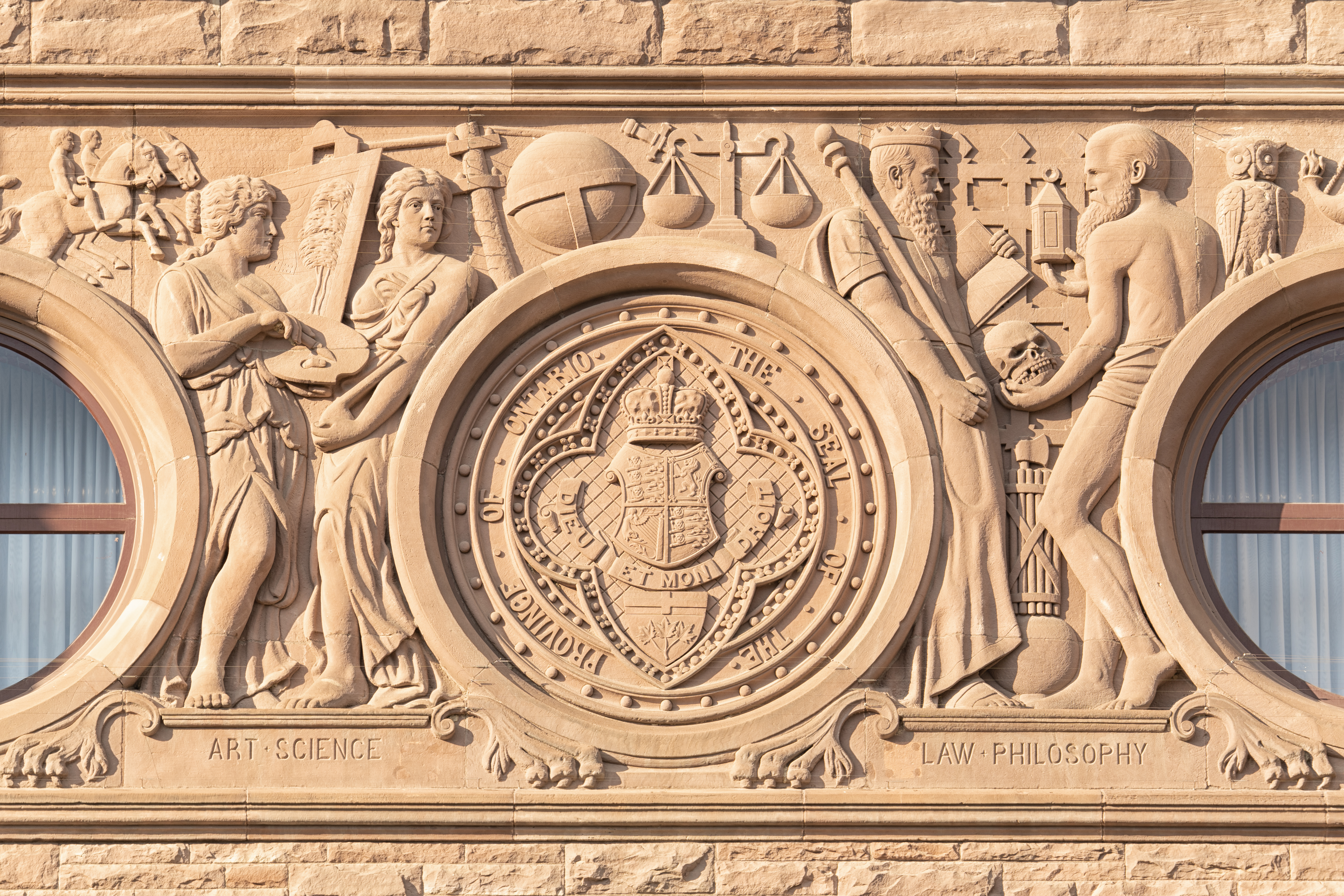
The Great Seal of Ontario on the facade of Ontario Legislative Building

The Great Seal of Ontario is a governmental seal used to authenticate documents issued by the Canadian Government of Ontario that are released in the name of the King in Right of Ontario, including the appointment of the Executive Council and Ministers (the Cabinet).

== Design ==
In the centre of the Great Seal is the shield from the royal coat of arms of the United Kingdom (representing the link to Britain), with a Tudor Crown above and the armorial shield of Ontario below. Several borders surround these symbols, including the words "The Seal of the Province of Ontario" in English only.

A sculpture of the Great Seal is carved above the main entrance to the Ontario legislature at Queen's Park.

== History ==
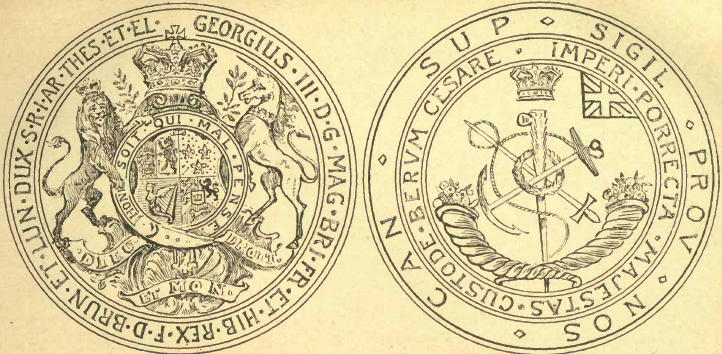
Great Seal of Upper Canada (right)

The Great Seal has been used since January 1, 1870, following the appointment through a Royal Warrant by Queen Victoria. The keeper of the Great Seal is the Lieutenant Governor of Ontario, but the Minister of Government and Consumer Services maintains day-to-day custody of the seal.

The current seal replaced the Great Seal of the Province of Canada, used from 1841 to 1867, under the 136th clause of the British North America Act, 1867. This former seal was carved on an interior wall of the House of Commons of Canada in Ottawa in 1953. Before 1841, the Great Seal of Upper Canada had been in use since 1792.

== See also ==
- Symbols of Ontario
- Great Seal of Canada
- Great Seal of Quebec
