= Great Seal of Quebec =

Governmental seal

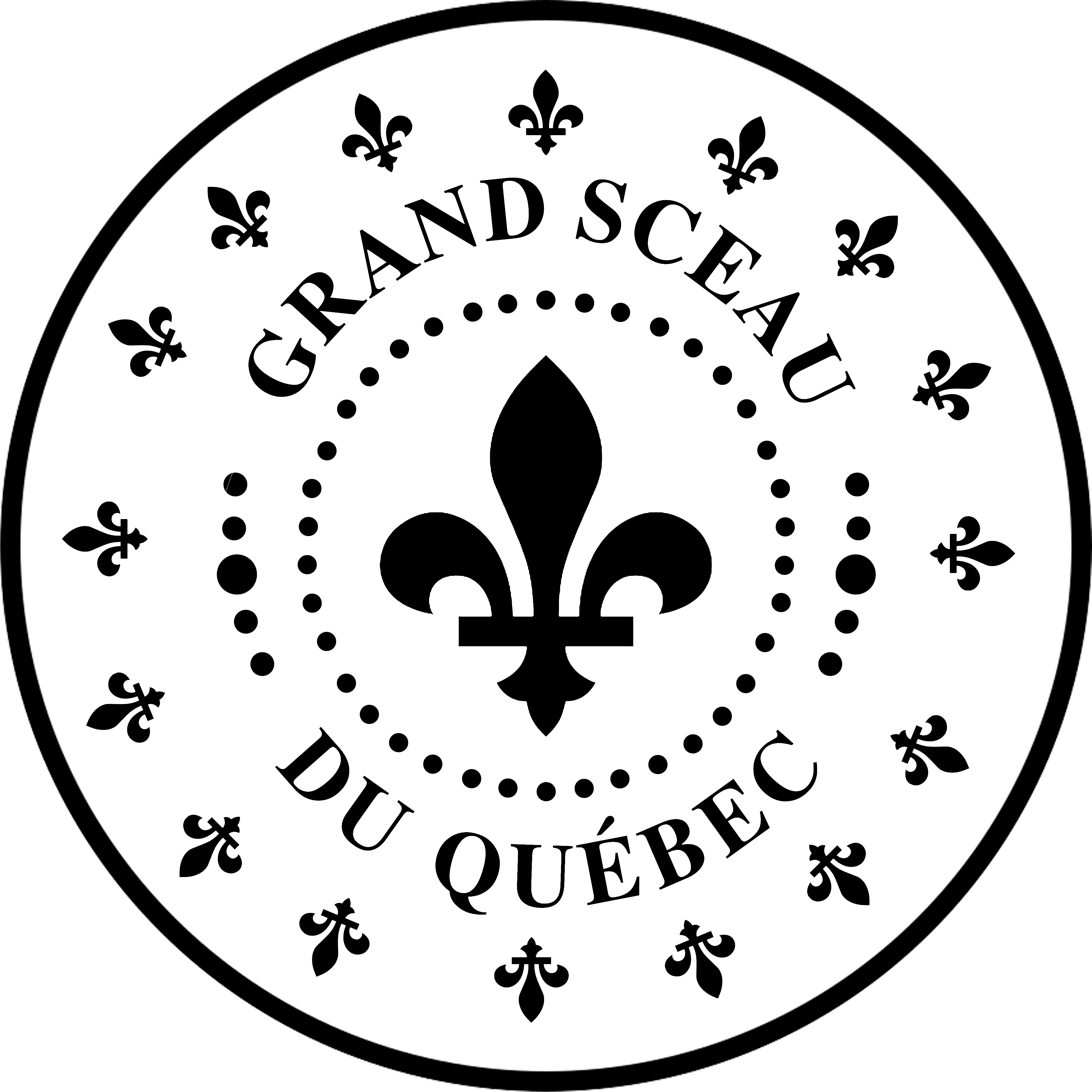
The Great Seal of Quebec

The Great Seal of Quebec (French: Grand Sceau du Québec) is a governmental seal used to authenticate documents issued by the Government of Quebec that are released in the name of the King in Right of Quebec, including the appointment of the Executive Council and Ministers (the Cabinet), as well as justices of the peace and judges of provincial courts.

== Design ==
The seal is blue with a large fleur-de-lis in the centre, surrounded by a ring of smaller fleurs-de-lis. The words Grand Sceau du Québec are displayed around the central fleur-de-lis.

In 1979, this seal replaced an earlier version, which displayed the shield from the royal coat of arms of the United Kingdom along with a Tudor Crown above and the coat of arms of Quebec below.

== See also ==
- Symbols of Quebec
- Great Seal of Ontario
- Great Seal of Canada
