= Seal of New Zealand =

National seal

- Adopted: 29 June 1959; 66 years ago
- Motto: NEW ZEALAND · ELIZABETH THE SECOND · QUEEN

The Seal of New Zealand is the official seal used in New Zealand to authorise important government documents, such as writs, officer commissions, judicial appointments, and letters patent. The seal is defined by the Seal of New Zealand Act 1977. The Seal of New Zealand Proclamation 1977 mandates the design of the seal. The governor-general of New Zealand has custody of the seal, for all official instruments of "His Majesty's Government in New Zealand".

== Background ==
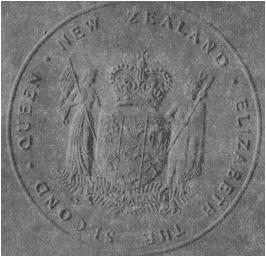
Impression of the current seal of New Zealand

With the establishment of New Zealand as a British Crown Colony in 1841, all official instruments of the colonial government were sealed with the Public Seal of New Zealand. Governor William Hobson wrote a dispatch of 6 August 1841 to the Colonial Secretary in Britain acknowledging its receipt. The seal was designed by Benjamin Wyon, Chief Engraver to the Seals. The design depicted Queen Victoria of the United Kingdom in treaty with a group of Māori chiefs.

A second seal, also designed by Benjamin Wyon, was approved by Queen Victoria in February 1848. The new design did not incorporate chiefs, perhaps because of the New Zealand wars being fought at the time. It was dispatched with seals for New Ulster Province and New Munster Province and was received on 8 September 1848. This seal, which was made of silver, remained in use until 1880 when it was replaced with a steel one. Later seals were withdrawn on the death of a sovereign and replaced on the accession of a new ruler. Exceptions to this rule were at the death of King George V and the accession of King Edward VIII.

The third seal was engraved by Alfred Wyon, Chief Engraver of Her Majesty's Seals, son of Benjamin Wyon. It was received in early August 1881 and was in use until late 1903. The fourth seal was ordered on 17 February 1902 and received in November 1903. The fifth seal was dispatched from the United Kingdom on 29 July 1912, received on 1 October 1912, and defaced on 15 November 1939. The sixth seal came into use on 15 November 1939 and the seventh was ordered by a Royal Warrant, published on 28 July 1959.

Until 1977, the official instruments of the government in relation to New Zealand or New Zealand's dependent territories were either sealed with the Public Seal of New Zealand and in other cases with the Great Seal of the United Kingdom. With the Seal of New Zealand Act 1977, the governments of the Cook Islands, Niue and New Zealand concurred to have a single seal for all of the Realm of New Zealand. The current seal depicts the Coat of arms of New Zealand surrounded by the lettering "Elizabeth the Second Queen New Zealand". Despite the death of Queen Elizabeth II, use of this seal will be continued until a new Seal of New Zealand is proclaimed.

== See also ==
- Flag of New Zealand
- Seal of Niue
