= Symbols of Ontario =

Symbols of Canadian province

Ontario is a province of Canada that has established several official emblems and symbols to reflect the province's history, natural resources, and its people. In addition to official symbols, several other emblems and symbols exist that are commonly associated with the province.

== Official symbols ==
Several emblems and symbols are used to officially represent the province, established through royal warrant or through the Legislative Assembly of Ontario. They include:

	Symbol	Image	Adopted	Notes
Coat of arms	Coat of arms of Ontario	Coat of Arms of Ontario	May 26, 1868, augmented on February 27, 1909	The present coat of arms was adopted on February 27, 1909, by royal warrant of King Edward VII. The design builds upon the original shield of arms granted by royal warrant of Queen Victoria on May 26, 1868, with the addition of supporters, crest, and motto.
Shield of arms	Shield of arms of Ontario	Shield of Arms of Ontario	May 26, 1868	The shield of arms was granted by royal warrant of Queen Victoria. The shield of arms is used on the current-arms escutcheon. Gold maple leaves were adopted on the shield of arms as it historically represented Ontario (whereas green maple leaves represented Quebec).
Motto	Ut incepit fidelis sic permanet (English: Loyal she began, loyal she remains)		1909	The motto is a reference to the United Empire Loyalists, and was granted with other elements of the coat of arms in 1909. The motto is in Latin, and may also be translated as "Loyal she began, thus she remains".
Flag	Flag of Ontario	Flag of Ontario	April 14, 1965	It is a defaced Red Ensign, with the Royal Union Flag in the canton and the Ontario shield of arms in the fly. Queen Elizabeth II approving the use of the Royal Union Flag in the design and the flag was adopted by the Legislative Assembly of Ontario in 1965. The flag was approved by the legislature on April 14, 1965, and was first raised on May 21, 1965.
Flower	White trillium Trillium grandiflorum	White trillium	1937	Adopted as the province's official floral emblem through the Floral Emblem Act, 1937. The adoption of the white trillium grew out of a movement during the First World War to choose a national floral emblem appropriate for planting on the graves of Canadian servicemen overseas. Found in the forests and woodlands of Ontario, it blooms in late April and May. They are very sensitive to light and usually bend toward the sun as it moves across the sky. Contrary to popular belief, it is not illegal to pick a White Trillium in Ontario. However, picking the flower can seriously injure the plant and it can take years to recover.
Bird	Common loon Gavia immer	Common loon	June 23, 1994	The common loon was designated as an official emblem of the province through the Avian Emblem Act, 1994. The common loon is found across the province. The image of a common loon is also displayed on the Canadian one-dollar coin, commonly called a "loonie".
Francophone flag	Franco-Ontarian flag	The Franco-Ontarian Flag	September 24, 2020	Recognized under provincial law as an emblem of the province of Ontario, as well as Franco-Ontarians. The flag was adopted as an official emblem of Ontario in 2020 by the Legislative Assembly of Ontario, through an amendment to the Franco-Ontarian Emblem Act. The flag was initially adopted as an emblem for Franco-Ontarians through the Franco-Ontarian Emblem Act on June 29, 2001.
Gemstone	Amethyst	Amethyst	July 7, 1975	Established as an official emblem of the province through the Mineral Emblem Act, 1975. Amethyst was adopted in order to represent the mineral wealth of the province. Amethyst can be found in clusters throughout northern Ontario, concentrating around the area of Thunder Bay.
Tartan	Red and white with three shades of green and two shades of blue		June 23, 2000	The tartan was created in 1965 by Rotex Ltd., although was not formally adopted as the provincial tartan until the Tartan Act, 2000 was passed. The tartan is made up of four blocks of colour, red, white, three shades of green and two shades of blue. The shades of green represent the forests and fields of Ontario, while the blue represents the waters. The red represents its First Nations and the white, the sky over the province.
Tree	Eastern white pine Pinus strobus	Eastern white pine	May 1, 1984	The eastern white pine was adopted as an official emblem of the province through the Arboreal Emblem Act, 1984. The tree species is found throughout Ontario. It is the tallest tree in the province and can live over 250 years. Known as "the Tree of Great Peace" by the Haudenosaunee First Nations of Southern Ontario. The eastern white pine was also an important source of income and trade during the province's early days.

== Other symbols ==
Several emblems and symbols exist that are commonly associated with province. They include:

	Symbol	Image	Created	Notes
Colours	Green and yellow or green and gold			
Anthem	A Place to Stand, a Place to Grow		1967	The song is considered as the "unofficial" anthem of the province. The song was commissioned by the government of Ontario in 1967 for a short film of the same name and was screened at the Ontario pavilion of Expo 67. The song was composed by Dolores Claman and Richard Morris. In 2016, the government of Ontario commissioned an "updated" version of the song and features a second verse in French.
Great Seal	The Great Seal of the Province of Ontario	Great Seal of Ontario	1870	The Great Seal of Ontario consists of the royal coat of arms of the United Kingdom, the Crown, the motto Dieu et mon droit (English: God and my right), and the shield of arms of Ontario. The Great Seal was created in 1870 by royal warrant of Queen Victoria and designed by the Chief Engraver of Her Majesty's Seals. It is used on official documents, proclamations, and commissions appointing public officials. The lieutenant governor of Ontario is sworn in as "Keeper of the Great Seal".
Logo	Government of Ontario wordmark	Original 1964 logo Current logo	1964 (introduced); 2019 (present design)	A black "trillium logo" was first introduced by the government of Ontario in 1964, and underwent minor modifications in 1972, 1994, and 2002. During the 1980s, the logo was imposed on a blue background. Modifications in 1994 included a change in colour to green, before it reverted to black in 2002. The logo was modified again in 2006, eliminating the box that surrounds the logo, and adding three abstract human figures to the design. In 2019, it reverted to a rendition similar to the original as its present design.
Order	Order of Ontario	Order of Ontario Order of Ontario ribbon	1986	The Order of Ontario is the province's highest honour that it can bestow on an individual. The order was created in 1986 with its first appointments made in 1987.
Provincial licence plate slogan	Yours to Discover or tant à découvrir	Sample Ontario licence plate Sample Ontario licence plate	1982–2020; 2020–present	Since 2008, licence plates may be ordered with the slogan in either the English or French language. The slogan is not used on provincial licence plates for electric vehicles. The present slogan Yours to Discover replaced the Keep it Beautiful slogan used on provincial licence plates from 1973 to 1982. In 2020, the current slogan was briefly replaced by a new slogan, A Place to Grow (French: en plein essor). However, the new slogan was later scrapped in that same year.

=== Symbols of the lieutenant governor of Ontario ===
There exists several official emblems and symbols to represent the lieutenant governor of Ontario.

	Symbol	Image	Created	Notes
Emblem	Emblem of the lieutenant governor of Ontario	Emblem of the lieutenant governor of Ontario		Consists of the Escutcheon of Arms of Ontario, surmounted by St. Edward's Crown, surrounded by ten golden maple leaves.
Flag	Flag of the lieutenant governor of Ontario	Flag of the lieutenant governor of Ontario	May 13, 1981	Consists of the Escutcheon of Arms of Ontario, surmounted by St. Edward's Crown, on a blue field, surrounded by ten golden maple leaves. It is flown outside the suite at Queen's Park when the lieutenant governor is in the provincial capital, Toronto. It is also displayed in the lieutenant governor's office and in the Music Room, where ceremonies take place. It is mounted on the car in which the lieutenant governor travels, and is flown at public buildings, Canadian Forces establishments, and on Her Majesty's Canadian Ships during official visits. The flag of the lieutenant governor takes precedence over all other flags in Ontario, including the National Flag of Canada, except in the presence of The Queen, when the Queen's Personal Canadian Flag is flown instead. The flag of the lieutenant governor also precedes the flag of the governor general of Canada in cases where the lieutenant governor is hosting an event at which the governor general of Canada is present. The flag is never lowered to half-mast; however, upon the death of a lieutenant governor while in office, it is taken down until a successor is installed.
Seal	Privy seal of the lieutenant governor of Ontario			The privy seal features the coat of arms of Ontario and is impressed through a red wafer. Used on commissions appointing the honorary aides-de-camps, and until 2002, certain public appointments and official documents were required to bear the seal.
