= Keeper of the Seals =

Person entitled to keep and authorize use of a country's great seal

The title keeper of the seals or equivalent is used in several contexts, denoting the person entitled to keep and authorize use of the great seal of a given country. The title may or may not be linked to a particular cabinet or ministerial office. This is most often the case today, but in the past the role was often a distinct and important job.

== Canada ==
A rendition of the Great Seal of Canada, unveiled in 2025, during the reign of King Charles III

The official Keeper of the Great Seal of Canada is the Governor General. At his or her installation, the governor general swears three oaths, one of which is the oath of the office of keeper of the great seal. The seal is also presented to the Governor General who entrusts it back to the registrar general for safekeeping. The seal is actually kept with the Registrar General of Canada, a title which since 1995 has been linked to the office of Minister of Industry.

Each province since 1869 has its own seal and their keepers are the provincial Lieutenant Governors. As the Registrar General actually keeps the Great seal of Canada, so the provincial Great Seals are placed by the lieutenant-governors of the provinces into the keeping of the provincial Attorneys-General.

== France ==
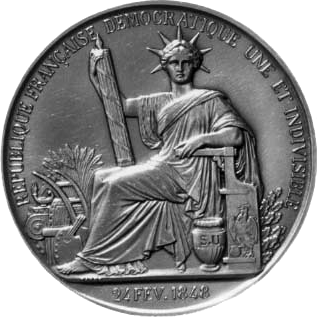
The Great Seal of France

The French Keeper of the Seals (Garde des Sceaux) is a title held by the Minister of Justice. Formerly, as Keeper of the Seals of France, this title belonged to the Chancellor, the ancien régime counterpart of the minister of justice. The title is nowadays often used interchangeably with "Minister of Justice of France."

The Minister of Justice guards the Great Seal of France, dating from 1848, in his or her office, as well as the stamping press. The Seal was used in 1958 to seal the Constitution of France and has since been used to seal certain constitutional amendments.

== Italy ==
In Italy, the Minister of Justice assumes the duties of Guardasigilli (Keeper of the Seals). As Guardasigilli, the Minister of Justice countersigns all laws and decrees signed by the president and the decrees issued by other ministries. The Minister of Justice is also the editor of the Gazzetta Ufficiale della Repubblica Italiana, the official bulletin of the Italian Republic.

== Japan ==
The Lord Keeper of the Privy Seal of Japan (内大臣, Naidaijin) was an administrative post not of Cabinet rank in the government of the Empire of Japan, responsible for keeping the Privy Seal of Japan and State Seal of Japan.

== Netherlands ==
In the Netherlands, custody of the great seal is held ex-officio by the Minister of Justice.

== New Zealand ==
The Governor-General of New Zealand has custody of the Seal of New Zealand. However, responsibility for the seal is delegated to the Clerk of the Executive Council. The seal is affixed to various instruments that require it.

== Papacy ==
In medieval and Renaissance times the Papal Custode del Piombo ("Keeper of the Lead") was an important and well-paid office, always held by a friar. The painter Sebastiano del Piombo held it from 1531 until his death in 1546, and the nickname he is known by came from his job-title. He had to take holy orders for the purpose, despite having a wife and two sons. The position was usually awarded for life, and in the Renaissance was often given to artists who worked on papal projects. The important architect Bramante had been appointed in 1513, but died the next year, when Mariano Fetti succeeded. He was already a friar, and a sort of court jester, but also an intimate friend to the Medici Pope Leo X. He held the role under three popes until his death in 1531, when Sebastiano succeeded him.

== United Kingdom ==
Several British officials have titles connected to the keeping of seals.

| Title | Seal | | Current Holder |
|---|---|---|---|
| Lord High Chancellor; Lord Keeper of the Great Seal | Great Seal of the Realm | The office today is primarily concerned with the administration of the courts, and is linked by constitutional convention to the office of Secretary of State for Justice; all Justice Secretaries since the creation of the office have also been appointed Lord Chancellor. Prior to the Constitutional Reform Act 2005, the office had had substantial legislative, executive, and judicial power; the Act stripped the Lord Chancellor of non-executive functions (besides sitting in Parliament when held by an MP or a Peer entitled to a seat in the Lords). The office's responsibilities had previously not only been those of the chief administrator of the court system but also of presiding officer of the House of Lords (succeeded in that capacity by the Lord Speaker) and of a judge or judge-like position on several judicial bodies. | Shabana Mahmood |
| Lord Keeper of the Privy Seal | Privy Seal of England | One of the nine Great Officers of State. Today this a sinecure office used to bring a person into the British Cabinet as a Minister without Portfolio. Until the English Reformation this was usually held by a bishop, the change being marked by Thomas Boleyn, 1st Earl of Wiltshire, after his daughter Anne Boleyn became Queen. | The Baroness Smith of Basildon |
| Keeper | Great Seal of Scotland | An official entrusted with the Great Seal of Scotland, generally given to holders of Scotland-specific offices. Currently held ex officio by the First Minister of Scotland. The position also grants the First Minister a position in the order of precedence by virtue of his or her position as Keeper of the Great Seal of Scotland. Before the Scotland Act 1998 created the office of First Minister, the position of Keeper of the Great Seal of Scotland was generally given to the Secretary of State for Scotland. | John Swinney |
| Keeper | Great Seal of Northern Ireland | A title previously held by the Governor of Northern Ireland from 1922 until 1973 when it was presented to the Secretary of State for Northern Ireland. | Hilary Benn |
| Keeper | Welsh Seal | An office created by the Government of Wales Act 2006 that is held ex-officio by the First Minister of Wales. It grants the minister an official position for purposes of the Order of Precedence. No Welsh Seal had previously existed since those used by the native Princes of Wales. | Rhun ap Iorwerth |
| Keeper | Privy Seal of Scotland | An honour traditionally given to a Scottish Peer, vacant since 1922. | vacant |
| Keeper | Great Seal of Cornwall | Held by the Chancellor of Cornwall. Appointed by the Duchy of Cornwall, vacant since 1867. | vacant |
| Keeper | Privy Seal of Cornwall | Appointed by the Duchy of Cornwall, vacant since 1933. | vacant |

== United States ==
The United States Secretary of State is the official keeper of the Great Seal of the United States, and the seal may only be affixed to instruments as provided by law or by authorization of the President. The authority to manage the operation of the device is delegated to an official at the State Department. This official is the Director of the Office of Presidential Appointments, the office that manages the Great Seal at the Department of State. Informally, the director is sometimes referred to as the “Keeper” in the sense that the job has been delegated.

Unlike the Great Seals listed above, the Great Seal of the United States is the primary graphical emblem of the United States and is used equivalently to a coat of arms.

The seals of individual U.S. states are typically the responsibility of the State Secretary of State.
