= Coat of arms of Ontario =

Canadian provincial heraldic symbol

Arms of His Majesty The King in Right of Ontario

Versions
- For use by the lieutenant governor of Ontario

- For use by the Government of Ontario

- Second SVG version of the coat of arms of Ontario
- Armiger: Charles III in Right of Ontario
- Adopted: 1868, augmented 1909
- Crest: Upon a wreath of the colours a bear passant Sable
- Shield: Vert, a sprig of three maple leaves slipped Or, on a chief argent a cross gules.
- Supporters: On the dexter side a moose and on the sinister side a deer, both proper.
- Motto: UT INCEPIT FIDELIS SIC PERMANET; Loyal she began, loyal she remains

The coat of arms of Ontario is the armorial emblem representing the Canadian province of Ontario. The arms contain symbols reflecting Ontario's British heritage, along with local symbols. At the upper part of the shield is the red cross of St. George, representing England. The lower portion of the shield features three golden maple leaves on a green background.

The original arms, consisting of only the shield, were granted by royal warrant of Queen Victoria on 26 May 1868. The arms were further augmented with supporters, a crest and a motto, by royal warrant of King Edward VII on 27 February 1909.

The shield, on a Red Ensign, features in the provincial flag of Ontario.

== History ==
The year following Confederation, arms were granted by royal warrant from Queen Victoria on 26 May 1868 to Ontario, along with the three other provinces of the new Dominion of Canada, Quebec, Nova Scotia and New Brunswick. The Dominion Arms were simple and lacked supporters. The Arms of Ontario comprised what is now the escutcheon or shield of the current Arms of Ontario. This original arms can be seen on the Flag of Ontario, which consists of a defaced Red Ensign, with the Royal Union Flag in the canton and the arms in the fly. Also seen on the Arms used by the Lieutenant Governor of Ontario surrounded by a wreath of gold maple leaves.

In the warrant, Queen Victoria authorized the four arms of the first provinces to be quartered for use on the Great Seal of Canada, and while this was not done for the first Great Seal, it is through this reference it became the de facto Arms of Canada until 1921. That arms was then also used in the first Canadian Red Ensign, which was flown at the Battle of Vimy Ridge.

The supporters, crest, and motto, designed by Toronto barrister Edward Marion Chadwick, were added on 27 February 1909, by warrant of King Edward VII.

The province's arms stand out for being without royal symbols, namely a crown—although the motto of Ontario, which translates from the Latin "Ut Incepit Fidelis Sic Permanet" as "Loyal She Began, Thus She Remains" references perpetual loyalty to the Crown.

== Symbolism ==
Crest

The crest is a black bear, native to Ontario, passant sable, on a gold and green wreath.

Shield

The shield of arms consists of three gold maple leaves, representative of Ontario, on a green background, above which on the upper third is a wide white band with a red Saint George's Cross, which recalls the historic connection with Britain in Upper Canada. The shield also appears on Ontario's Flag itself.

Supporters

A moose (dexter) and a deer (sinister), which are native to Ontario.

Motto

The motto is "Ut incepit fidelis sic permanet", Latin for "Loyal she began, loyal she remains". It refers to the Loyalist refugees from the American Revolution, who settled in the colony of Quebec, and for whom the area was separated as Upper Canada.

== See also ==
- Arms of Canada
- Canadian heraldry
- Coat of arms of Toronto
- Flag of Ontario
- Heraldry
- List of Canadian provincial and territorial symbols
- National symbols of Canada
- Ontario
- Symbols of Ontario
