= Great Seal of Canada =

National seal of Canada

Great Seal of Canada Grand Sceau du Canada
- Seal used during the reign of Charles III
- Adopted: 1867 (First seal); 2025 (Current design)
- Use: Granting legal force to documents of state on the advice of the Canadian Government

The Great Seal of Canada (French: Grand Sceau du Canada) is an official great seal used for certifying the authenticity of important state documents issued in the name of the Canadian monarch. As a symbol of the Crown's authority, it represents the constitutional power bestowed upon Canada's parliamentary government by the sovereign. While primarily a tool of governance, the Great Seal is also considered an unofficial symbol of Canada.

The seal is under the formal custody of the governor general of Canada, though day-to-day care is managed by the registrar general of Canada. Originally a deputed seal to the British Great Seal of the Realm, the Great Seal of Canada was later elevated in status with the passage of the Seals Act of 1939. Reflecting Canada's transition from a British dominion to an independent realm, it now symbolizes Canada's own sovereign authority.

A distinct Great Seal of Canada has been issued for each monarch since Canadian Confederation, except for Edward VIII, with the seal's outer ring inscribed with the name of the sovereign. Each Great Seal issued in the 19th and 20th centuries also featured a unique image of the monarch it was issued for on its central disc. In 2025, however, a permanent design for the central disc was introduced, replacing the sovereign's image with the Canadian Royal Crown.

== Use ==
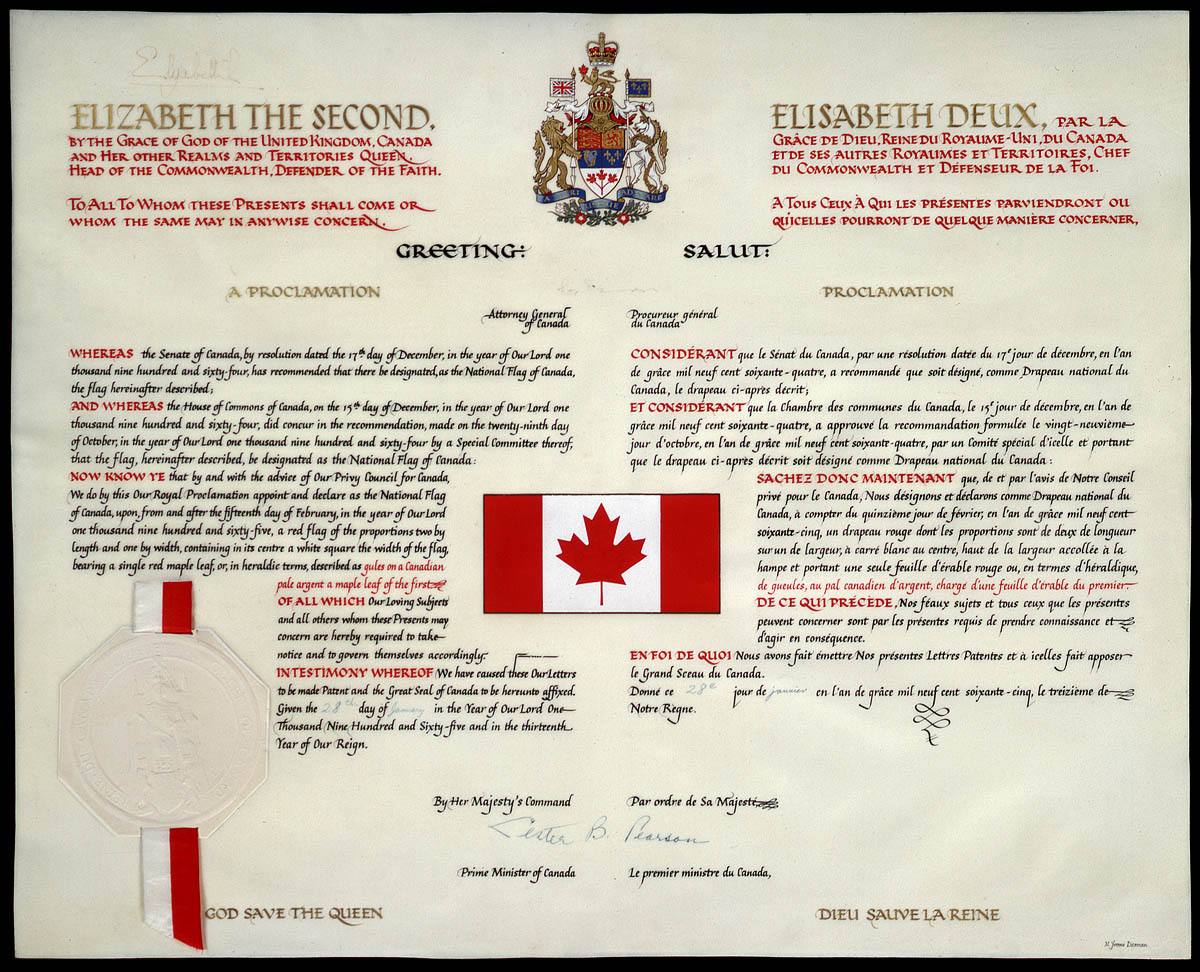
Royal proclamation for the flag of Canada, bearing an impression of the Great Seal at bottom left

The Great Seal of Canada has an administrative and ceremonial purpose, being one of the country's oldest instruments of government. It symbolizes the power and authority of the Crown given to the parliamentary government by the sovereign.

The Great Seal is used to authenticate important documents, including all state documents like Royal proclamations and commissions for the appointment of lieutenant governors, Cabinet ministers, senators, and judges. Through its imprint, the seal symbolizes the authority and will of the Crown, and has been called by some an unofficial symbol of Canada. The Great Seal of Canada has also assumed broader functions than its British counterpart, the Great Seal of the Realm, as it's also used for sealing signed manual warrants—duties that, in the United Kingdom, would traditionally fall to a signet.

The governor general of Canada is officially charged with custody of the Great Seal. The governor general is presented the Great Seal of Canada during their swearing-in ceremony. During the same ceremony, the registrar general of Canada becomes the keeper of the seal, and maintains day-to-day custody over it. Although the Great Seal is the governor general's seal, the Seals Act of 1939 allows the sovereign to use it in place of the Great Seal of the Realm for any Canadian royal instrument. (Note: The Seals Act of 1939 empowers the sovereign to use the Great Seal of Canada on Canadian royal instruments in place of the British Great Seal of the Realm. However, it does not explicitly replace the Great Seal of the Realm with the Great Seal of Canada. The Canadian Seals Act differs from the Seals Act passed in the Irish Free State and the Union of South Africa, whose legislation explicitly replaced the British Great Seal of the Realm with new national seals.)

The Great Seal of Canada is protected under Canadian law due to its significance in government operations and procedures. Under Section 5 of the Security of Information Act, unauthorized use, possession, or reproduction of official instruments, including those resembling or intended to replicate the Great Seal, constitutes a criminal offence.

== History ==
=== Colonial seals ===
Canada's heraldic tradition and its symbolisms, including its seals, originate from British and French traditions. The first seal of royal authority created specifically for use in New France was created in 1663, after it was made a royal province. The seal played a significant role in colonial administration and was held by the Sovereign Council of New France as a symbol of royal authority. The seal was engraved with the royal arms of France and an inscription reading NOVVELLE FRANCE.

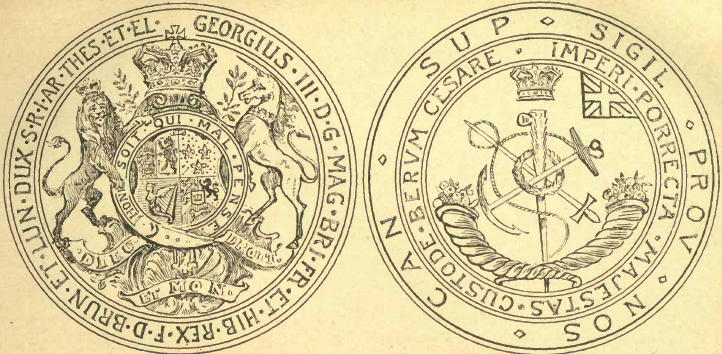
The Great Seal of Upper Canada was an example of a colonial great seal used in British North America

The British colonies also used deputed seals for local governance, with the 1730 seal of Nova Scotia and the 1760s seal of Quebec considered the direct predecessors of the Great Seal of Canada. The former seal featured the royal arms of Great Britain encircled by royal titles on one side, and a motif representing the colony along with a motto on the other. The latter depicted King George III in coronation robes, standing before a scroll bearing a map of eastern Canada. Seals were also created for the colonies of Lower and Upper Canada after their establishment in 1791, and later for the Province of Canada following the Act of Union 1840.

British North American seals were typically replaced only at the beginning of a new monarch’s reign, though certain events, such as the modifications to the new royal arms or changes in titles, necessitated updates. Following the issuance of new seals, old seals were returned to Britain to be officially defaced and melted or discarded.

=== Great Seal of Canada ===
The Great Seal of Canada was established following Canadian Confederation in 1867. Initially the Great Seal of Canada was a deputed seal, supreme within its jurisdiction but subordinate to the British Great Seal of the Realm. Before 1939, certain instruments in Canada were still issued under the British Great Seal of the Realm, including full powers authorizing the signing of treaties and conventions, instruments of ratification for those agreements, and letters patent establishing the office of the governor general of Canada. Additionally, royal instruments such as warrants authorizing the use of the Great Seal, commissions appointing the governor general, and instructions to the governor general were issued under the royal signets.

In 1938, ahead of King George VI’s planned royal tour of Canada, Prime Minister William Lyon Mackenzie King raised concerns about the constitutionality of the King performing acts of state while in Canada. A legal opinion from Ernest Lapointe, the Minister of Justice and Attorney General of Canada, confirmed that the King could carry out most executive functions normally performed by the governor general, except those explicitly assigned to the governor general by statute. However, certain royal prerogatives, such as issuing instruments of ratification or letters of credence, had not been delegated to the governor general and were still exercised by the monarch based in the UK, who used instruments like the Great Seal of the Realm.

This raised the question of whether the Great Seal of Canada could be used for such acts. The Department of Justice advised that using the Great Seal of Canada for treaty ratification would require legislative authorization. Lapointe affirmed that Parliament had the constitutional authority to provide such authorization, leading to the passage of the Seals Act in 1939 before George VI's royal tour of Canada.

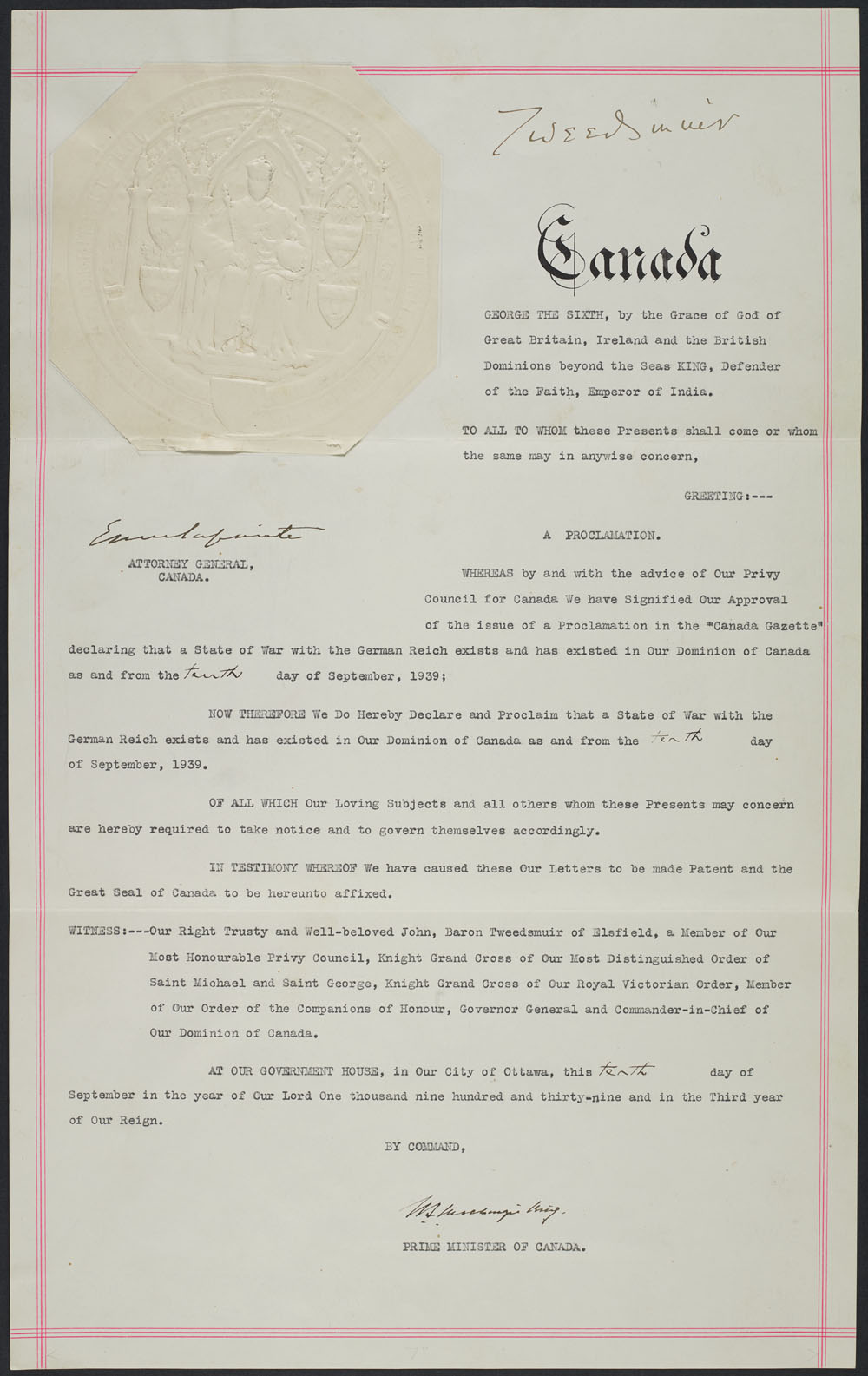
The Canadian declaration of war on Germany, issued on 10 September 1939, bearing the Great Seal of Canada.

The Act formally enabled the use of the Great Seal of Canada for ratifying treaties, allowing the sovereign to append all royal instruments in Canada with the Great Seal of Canada rather than the British Great Seal of the Realm. The Great Seal of Canada was first used in place of the Great Seal of the Realm to ratify a diplomatic agreement on 19 May 1939, when King George VI used it to ratify the 1938 Rainy Lake Convention for Canada. Since the Seals Act of 1939, the Great Seal of Canada had replaced the British Great Seal of the Realm for all Canadian uses.

The passage of the Seals Act formally established the Great Seal of Canada as the symbol through which instruments are issued, representing the "supreme expression of the will of [the Canadian] state." By authorizing its use by the King to ratify international agreements, the Act created a new official procedure that asserted and recognized Canada's equal political status within the British Empire. The Act also effectively eliminated need to travel to London to obtain the imprint of the Great Seal of the Realm.

Although the Seals Act of 1939 effectively eliminated the need to use the Great Seal of the Realm on Canadian state documents by allowing them to be sealed with the Great Seal of Canada, legal scholar Peter Hogg argues that treaties in head-of-state form still formally required sealing in London, noting the technicality remained unresolved until the issuance of the Letters Patent, 1947, which enabled all formalities to be completed using the Great Seal of Canada.

== Designs ==
Including the temporary seal issued in 1867, there have been eight Great Seals of Canada, one for each monarch of Canada, except for Edward VIII, who abdicated before a seal could be produced. Following British tradition, Canada customarily continues to use a late monarch's Great Seal after their death, until a new one is issued in the name of the reigning sovereign. Only Queen Victoria and King George VI had two Great Seals issued in their name. The 1867 temporary Great Seal was issued in Victoria's name before a permanent one entered use in 1869, and a second seal was issued for George VI after he relinquished the Emperor of India title in 1947.

The Canadian Royal Crown, a permanent visual element used on the central disc of the Great Seal since 2025

Before 2025, each Great Seal featured a design entirely unique to the reigning monarch and was replaced after the accession of a new sovereign. In 2025, however, a "hybrid" design was introduced which included a permanent central disc to be used on all future Great Seals, and an outer ring that remains unique to each reigning sovereign.

All Great Seals of Canada, except those issued in the name of Queen Victoria, are made of tempered steel, with the counterseal crafted from a copper alloy. The seals issued for Victoria were made of silver, but the metal proved too soft to withstand the pressure required for sealing and was therefore not used in subsequent designs.

All matrices of past Great Seals of Canada, except for the 1867 temporary Great Seal, are preserved by the National Archives of Canada in recognition of their historical, symbolic, and artistic significance.

=== Queen Victoria ===
==== Temporary seal ====
The first Great Seal of Canada, a temporary seal issued in Queen Victoria's name, came into official use on 1 July 1867. It featured the royal arms of the United Kingdom and the Latin inscriptions VICTORIA D · BRITT · REG · F · D (transl. Victoria, by the Grace of God Queen of Great Britain, Defender of the Faith) and SIGILLUM CANADÆ (transl. Seal of Canada). The base of the seal, extending upward to the motto, displayed the rose of England, an Irish shamrock, and the Scottish thistle. The temporary seal was originally intended for use only a few months, but disagreements over the design of its replacement delayed its defacement until 1869. At 80 millimetres (3.1 in), the temporary Great Seal was smaller than subsequent Great Seals, and was made out of copper.

==== Permanent seal ====
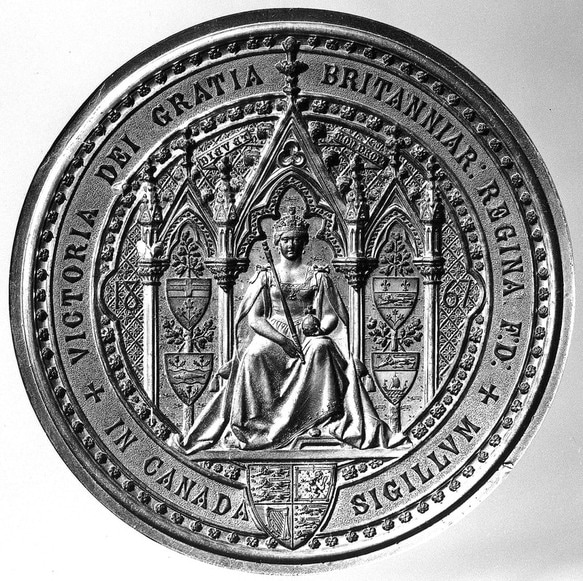
The 1869 permanent Great Seal of Canada that was issued in Queen Victoria's name

The permanent Great Seal issued in Victoria's name was used from mid-1869, and saw use for nearly 35 years. It depicts Victoria wearing a stylized heraldic crown, the collar of the Order of the Garter, and state robes, seated beneath a triple Gothic canopy adorned with roses, shamrocks, and thistles at the hem. She holds the sceptre with the cross in her right hand and an orb in her left. The arms of the four founding provinces of Canada are displayed in the niches to the right and left of the canopy. A scroll bearing the royal motto Dieu et mon droit appears at the top while the royal arms appears at the bottom. The diameter of the Great Seal measures 124 millimetres (4.9 in).

=== King Edward VII ===
The design process for Edward VII’s Great Seal was lengthy, with sketches prepared in the United Kingdom and sent to Canada for revisions until both parties reached a mutual agreement. A Canadian government committee had largely recommended that the overall design follow the design of the prior Great Seal, although some pushed for the incorporation of arms from provinces that joined Confederation since 1867. However, the idea was abandoned, partly because the arms of British Columbia, Manitoba, and Prince Edward Island lacked official recognition from the monarch at the time. The design of the Great Seal was further delayed by the death of the engraver responsible for its creation, whose estate executor refused to release the design documents. Edward VII’s Great Seal was eventually brought into use in Canada on 4 July 1905.

The design closely imitates the 1869 Great Seal, although he is also adorned by a garter worn by his 14th-century namesake, Edward III, and is depicted wearing the Imperial State Crown. The seal's legend reads EDWARVS VII D · G · BRITT · ET TERRARVM TRANSMAR · QVÆ IN DIT · SVNT BRIT · REX F · IND · IMP (transl. Edward VII, by the Grace of God, of Great Britain and of the British Dominions beyond the Seas King, Defender of the Faith, Emperor of India) and IN CANADA SIGILLVM 1904 (transl. Seal of Canada 1904). It measures 125 millimetres (4.9 in) in diameter.

=== King George V ===
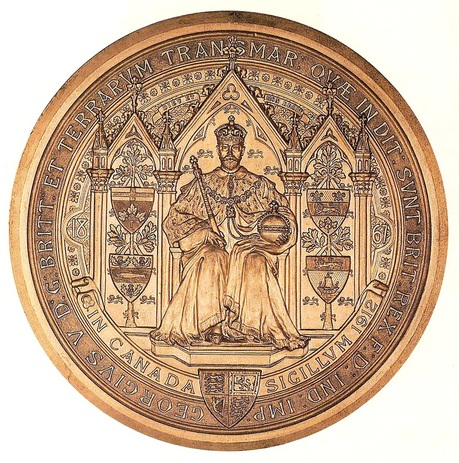
The 1912 Great Seal of Canada that was issued in King George V's name

A Great Seal issued for George V was created in 1912. George's seal was more conservative in stately, austere and conservative in nature, with the Sovereign depicted with the robe of state. The legend reads the same as Edward VII's Great Seal, except for the name GEORGIVS V and the date 1912. Like its predecessor, George V's Great Seal measures 125 millimetres (4.9 in).

The Great Seal issued for George V remained in use throughout King Edward VIII’s brief reign in 1936, as Edward abdicated before a new seal could be issued in his name. Before his abdication, proposals were introduced for Edward VIII's Great Seal to be designed by a Canadian artist and produced by the Royal Mint.

=== King George VI ===
==== First seal ====
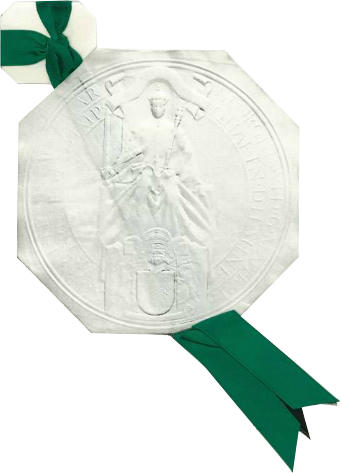
An imprint of the first Great Seal of Canada issued in George VI's name

The first Canadian Great Seal issued for George VI was also the first to be ordered at the instance of the Privy Council of Canada, although it was minted at the British Royal Mint. The Great Seal of George VI measures 127 millimetres (5.0 in). It is the first design that deviates significantly from the gothic ornamentation of its predecessors. George VI's Great Seal of Canada is also unique in that it is the only one to depict the sword of justice. Beneath the King's portrait is the coat of arms of Canada that was issued in 1921, replacing the four arms of the founding provinces. A double legend band reads GEORGIUS VI D · G · MAG · BRIT · HIB · ET TERR · TRANSMAR · QUAE IN DIT · SUNT BRIT · REX F · D · IMP · IND (transl. George VI, by the Grace of God, of Great Britain, Ireland and of the British Dominions Beyond the Seas, King, Defender of the Faith, Emperor of India), while the top legend reads IN CANADA SIGILLUM.

==== Second seal ====
Following the passage of the British Indian Independence Act 1947, a second Great Seal was issued for George VI in 1949 to reflect the removal of the title Emperor of India. This second seal is nearly identical to the first, except that it omits IND · IMP from the legend and extends the abbreviated F · D to FIDEI · DEF. The 1949 Great Seal was the first to be produced domestically, having been made by the Royal Canadian Mint, and remained in use until 14 November 1955.

=== Queen Elizabeth II ===
The Great Seal of Canada that was issued in Queen Elizabeth II's name, and first used in 1955

A Great Seal issued in Queen Elizabeth II's name was authorized for use on 14 November 1955. The development of Elizabeth II's Canadian Great Seal saw significant preparations, with the first Canadian artist, Eric Aldwinckle, selected to design the seal and Thomas Shingles of the Royal Canadian Mint as its engraver.

Like its predecessor, Elizabeth II's Great Seal depicts the Sovereign in state robes, wearing the crown and the collar of the Order of the Garter, and holding the orb and sceptre, with its surrounding design being austere. However, Elizabeth II's Great Seal abandons the use of the Latin language in favour of English and French, with the seal's legend reading REINE DU CANADA ELIZABETH II · QUEEN OF CANADA. Elizabeth II's Great Seal weighs 3.75 kilograms (8.3 lb).

=== King Charles III ===
On 12 June 2025, a Great Seal issued in King Charles III's name was unveiled to the public. Made by the Royal Canadian Mint, it introduced a permanent design for the central disc that will be used for Charles III and all future Canadian monarchs. The design of the new central ring depicts the Canadian Royal Crown within a decorative element inspired by the architecture of the rotunda in Centre Block's Confederation Hall. The design was created by Samy Khalid, the Chief Herald of Canada, and Cathy Bursey-Sabourin, the principal artist for the Canadian Heraldic Authority. The introduction of a permanent central disc allows future Great Seals to be updated more easily and produced at a lower cost.

The seal's outer ring will continue to be unique to each reigning monarch, bearing the name and title and will be updated with every succession. The seal issued for Charles III reads CHARLES III · KING OF CANADA · ROI DU CANADA.

== See also ==
- Canadian royal symbols
- Great Seal of Ontario
- Great Seal of Quebec
