= Mace of Nova Scotia =

Ceremonial mace of Canadian province

Mace of the Province of Nova Scotia
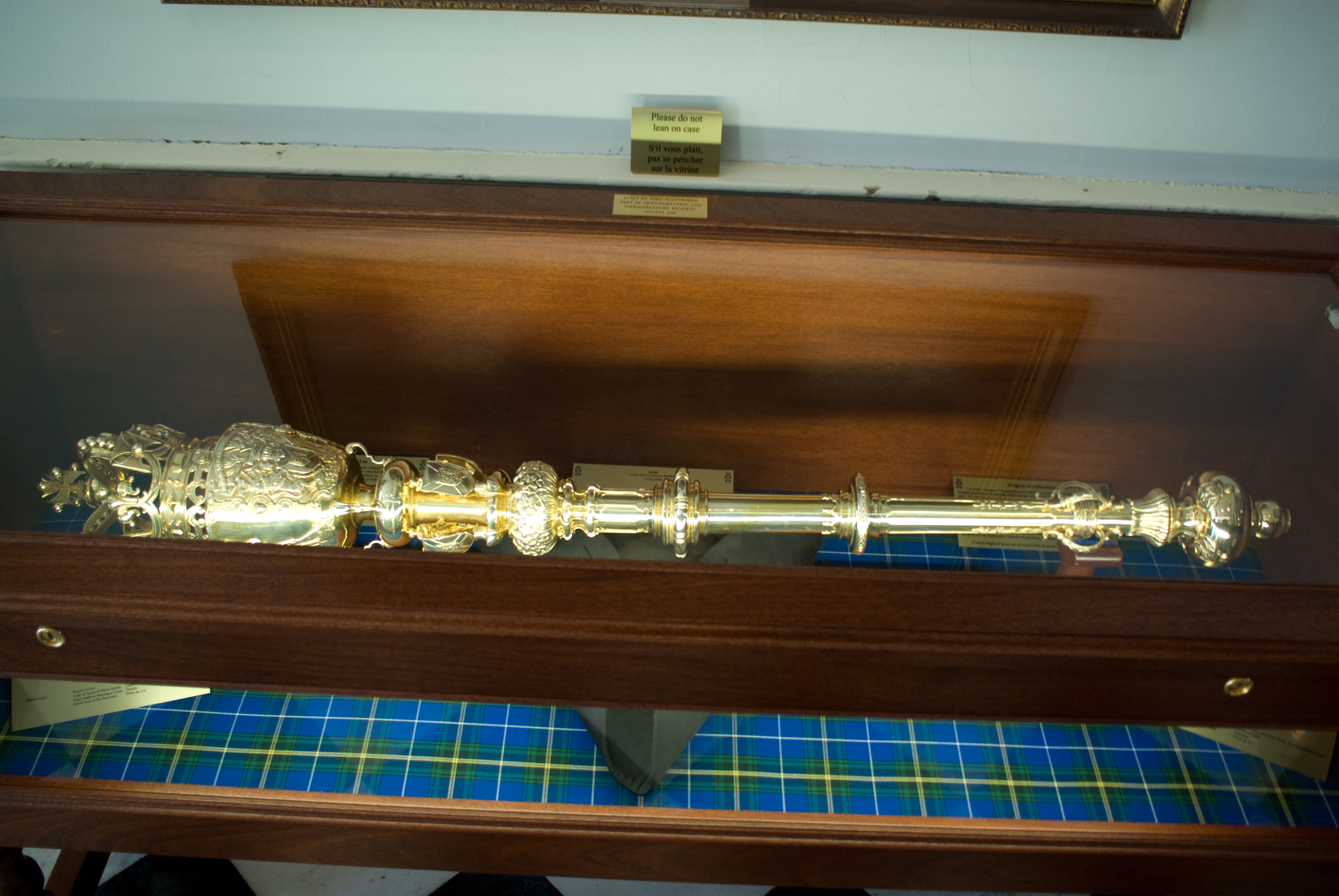
- The mace on display at Province House
- Type: Ceremonial mace
- Material: Gilded sterling silver
- Length: 1.21 metres (4.0 ft)
- Weight: ~18 pounds (8.2 kg)
- Symbols: Arms of Nova Scotia; Great Seal of Nova Scotia; Royal Crown of Scotland; St. Andrew
- Created: Elkington & Co.; Birmingham, England; 1929–1930
- Present location: Province House

The Mace of the Province of Nova Scotia is an ornamental ceremonial mace which serves as a symbol of authority in the Nova Scotia House of Assembly. The mace is constructed of gilded sterling silver, and was gifted to the House by Chief Justice Robert Harris in March 1930. The Nova Scotia House of Assembly had ordered a mace to be procured as early as 1785, but these orders were not carried out, making the mace gifted by Harris the first to be used in the House.

== Purpose and use ==
Ceremonial maces in Canada began as a tradition carried from the Parliament of the United Kingdom, where they represent the Sovereign's authority. This was derived from their use as lethal weapons of medieval knights in England, Scotland, and Wales, evolving into ceremonial objects carried by sergeants-at-arms.

The Mace of the Province of Nova Scotia serves as a symbol of the authority of the Speaker of the Nova Scotia House of Assembly to conduct business in the House. At the beginning of each sitting of the House, the mace is carried into the chamber by the Sergeant-at-Arms and placed on the table before the Speaker with the orb of the mace directed towards the government side of the House. When the House is adjourned, the mace is removed from the table by the Sergeant-at-Arms. In times when the Speaker is absent from the chair and the House resolves into a Committee of the Whole House, the mace is placed in brackets beneath the table.

The Sergeant-at-Arms serves as Guardian of the Mace, also fulfilling other ceremonial duties such as announcing and escorting the Lieutenant Governor and leading the procession of the Speaker into the House at the beginning of every sitting.

== Description ==
The Mace of the Province of Nova Scotia was manufactured by Elkington & Co. in Birmingham, England and is constructed of gilded sterling silver. The mace is approximately 1.21 metres (4.0 ft) in length, and weighs about 18 pounds (8.2 kg). The mace features a four arch crowned head, with the arches of the crown further decorated with prominent simulated pearl ribs. The four sides of the head of the mace depict the Royal Crown of Scotland, the Arms of Nova Scotia, the Great Seal of Nova Scotia, (Note: The Great Seal of Nova Scotia as depicted on the mace is the old seal used from 1839 to 1879.) and a depiction of St. Andrew. The mace was valued at over $1,000 in 1930.

Following the death of Chief Justice Robert Harris on 30 May 1931, the mace was inscribed with the following text:

This mace was presented to the House of Assembly of the Province of Nova Scotia by the Hon. Robert E. Harris, Chief Justice of Nova Scotia, and Mrs. Harris, March 1930

== History ==
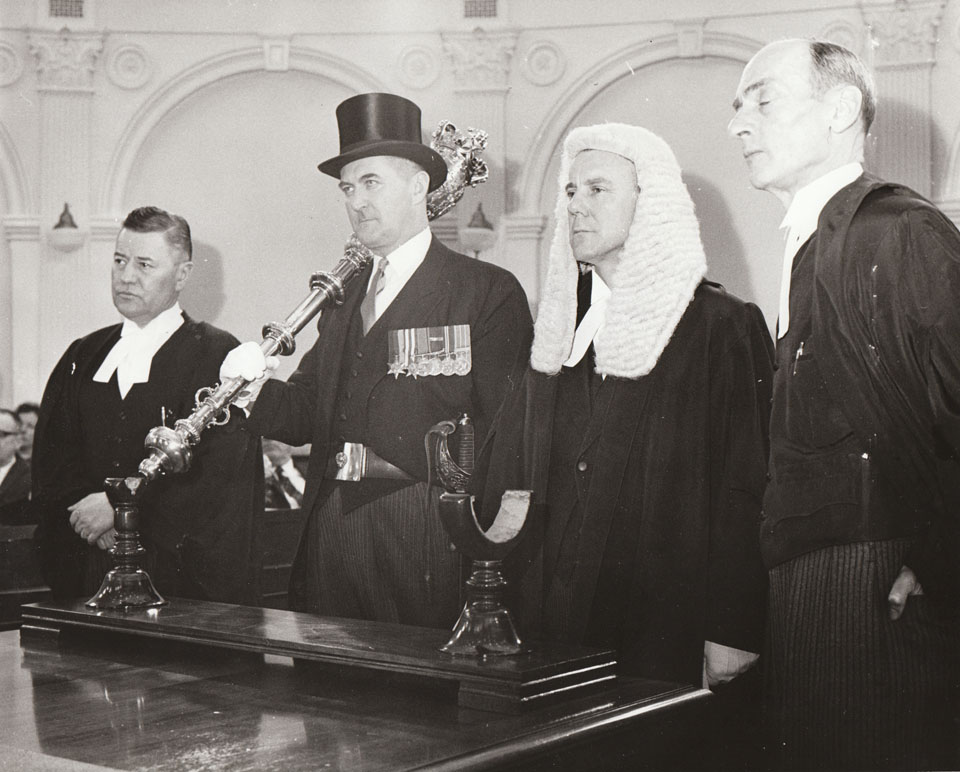
The Mace of Nova Scotia is wielded by the Sergeant-at-Arms (1962 photo)

The Nova Scotia House of Assembly ruled in 1785 and 1819 that a ceremonial mace was to be acquired for the house, but neither order was carried out. The first order was issued on 5 December 1785, and directed the Speaker to acquire robes for himself and the clerk of the House as well as procure a mace, payment for which would be provided by the House. The direction to acquire robes was carried out, however no progress was made on acquiring a mace, and the issue would not be raised again until over three decades later in 1819. On 16 April 1819, the Speaker was once again directed to procure robes and a mace, and still no progress was made on acquiring a mace. The issue was raised in the House once more on 29 January 1840, when a member put forward a motion to purchase a mace which was not met with support and subsequently did not pass.

The Mace of the Province of Nova Scotia was gifted to the legislature by Chief Justice Robert Harris of the Nova Scotia Supreme Court on 5 March 1930. This was the first mace to be used by the House and was thereafter wielded by the Sergeant-at-Arms. Prior to the gift of the mace, the Sergeant-at-Arms carried a court sword. Harris had initially wished for the gift to remain anonymous, but agreed to have the mace inscribed upon his death, with the cost of the inscription paid from his estate. The mace is depicted on the flag of the Nova Scotia House of Assembly, which was granted on 15 November 2019.

== See also ==
- Symbols of Nova Scotia
- General Assembly of Nova Scotia
