= Symbols of New Brunswick =

Symbols of Canadian province

New Brunswick is one of Canada's provinces, and has established several provincial symbols.

== Official symbols ==
	Symbol	Image	Adopted	Remarks
Crest of the lieutenant governor	Crest of the lieutenant governor of New Brunswick		1982	Formally approved 1980
Flag of the lieutenant governor	Flag of the lieutenant governor of New Brunswick		1982	Formally approved 1980
Coat of arms	Coat of arms of New Brunswick		September 25, 1984	Coat of arms granted by royal proclamation of Queen Elizabeth II
Motto	Spem reduxit It restored hope.		1784	Adopted as part of the colony's Great Seal in 1784
Shield of arms	Shield of arms of New Brunswick		May 26, 1868	Shield of arms granted by the Royal Warrant of Queen Victoria.
Flag	Flag of New Brunswick	Flag of New Brunswick	February 24, 1965	Duplicates the design of the shield of arms of New Brunswick
Tree	Balsam fir Abies balsamea	Balsam fir	May 1, 1987	The balsam fir accounts for 97 per cent of the New Brunswick Christmas tree industry.
Bird	Black-capped chickadee Parus atricapillus	Black-capped Chickadee	August 1983	"The black-capped chickadee was proclaimed as the official bird of New Brunswick in August 1983, following a contest conducted by the provincial Federation of Naturalists."
Flower	Purple violet Viola cucullata	Purple violets	1936	"The flower was adopted as the New Brunswick floral emblem in 1936, at the request of the provincial Women's Institute, the Lieutenant Governor and New Brunswick schoolchildren."
Soil	Holmesville Soil Series		February 13, 1997	Holmesville Soil is a fertile soil that provides high yields of both agriculture and forest crops.
Tartan	Forest green, meadow green and blue, interwoven with gold, with red blocks		1959	The provincial tartan was registered with the Court of Lord Lyon King of Arms in Scotland.
