= Premier of New Brunswick =

Head of government of New Brunswick

- Premier ministre du Nouveau-Brunswick
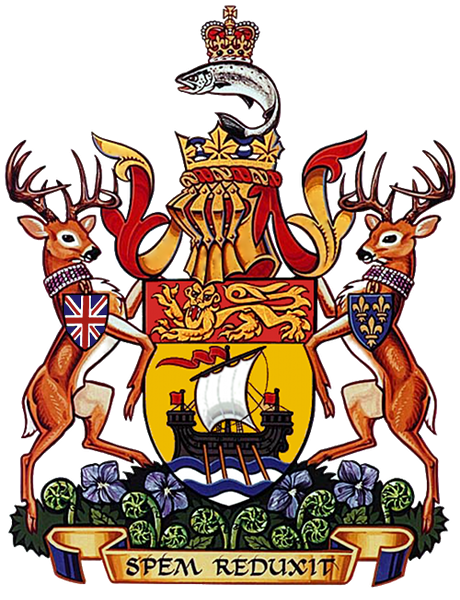
- Coat of Arms of New Brunswick

- Flag of New Brunswick

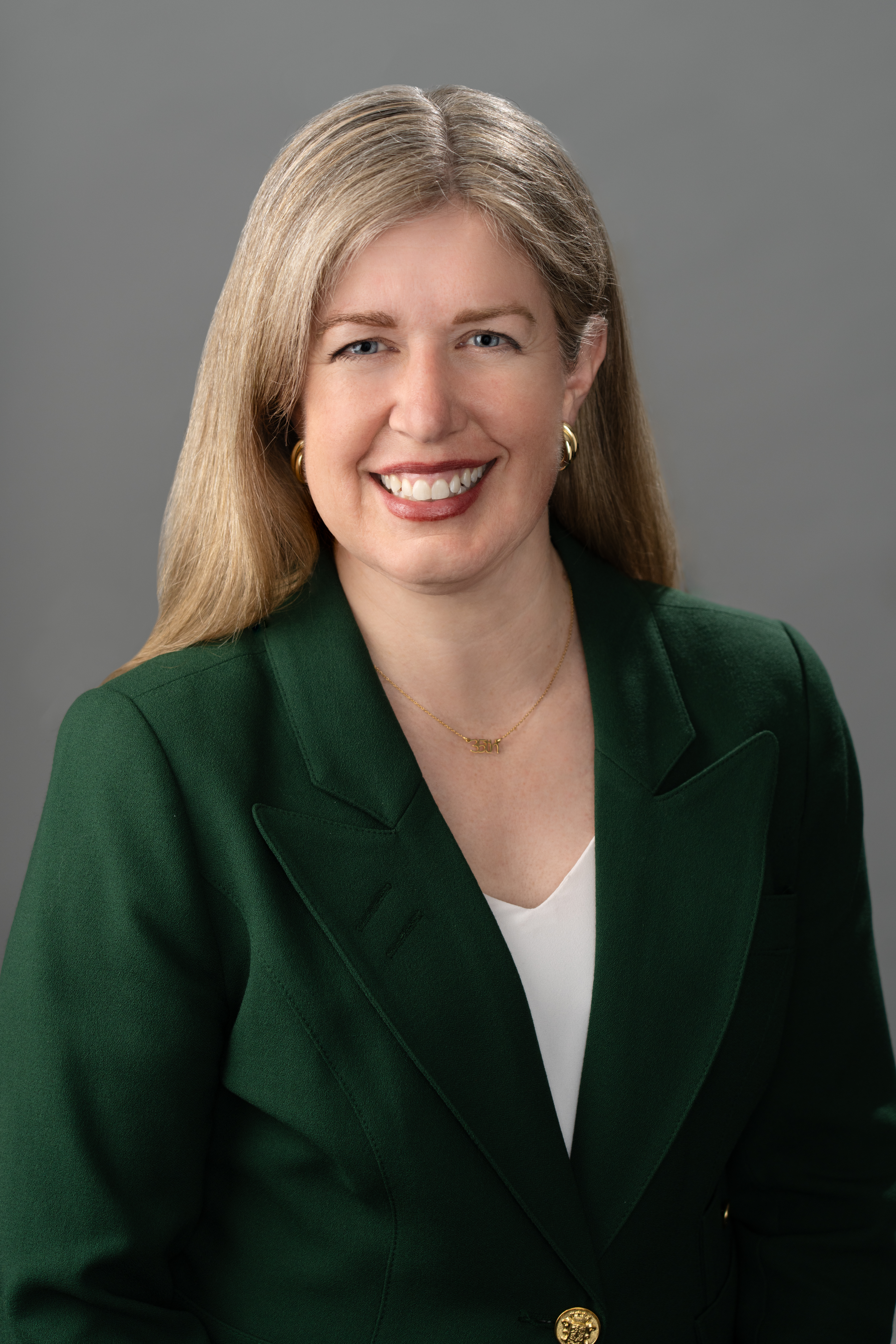
- Incumbent; Susan Holt since November 2, 2024
- Office of the Premier
- Style: The Honourable (formal); Premier (informal)
- Status: Head of Government
- Member of: Legislative Assembly; Executive Council
- Reports to: Legislative Assembly; Lieutenant Governor
- Seat: Fredericton
- Appointer: Lieutenant Governor of New Brunswick with the confidence of the New Brunswick Legislature
- Term length: At His Majesty's pleasure contingent on the premier's ability to command confidence in the legislative assembly
- Formation: August 16, 1867
- First holder: Andrew Rainsford Wetmore
- Deputy: Deputy premier of New Brunswick
- Salary: $164,000
- Website: Premier Official Site

The premier of New Brunswick (French: premier ministre du Nouveau-Brunswick (masculine) or première ministre du Nouveau-Brunswick (feminine)) is the first minister and head of government for the Canadian province of New Brunswick.

The premier of a Canadian province is much like the prime minister of Canada. They are normally the leader of the party or coalition with the most seats in the Legislative Assembly of New Brunswick. The premier is styled Honourable but is not a member of the privy council so this title is only for the duration of their term of office. Prior the establishment of the office, the Government leaders prior to responsible government was the chief political position in New Brunswick.

The premier is chosen by the lieutenant governor of New Brunswick.

The province of New Brunswick, since being established in 1785, has had a variety of leaders. Since the 1840s, responsible government has been in place and the position of premier has been formalized.

The current premier is Susan Holt since November 2, 2024. After winning a majority in the 2024 general election, she became the first female premier in New Brunswick.

== See also ==
- Politics of New Brunswick
- List of premiers of New Brunswick
- Premier (Canada)
