= Coat of arms of Nova Scotia =

Canadian provincial heraldic symbol

Arms of His Majesty The King in Right of Nova Scotia

Versions
- Escutcheon

- With orle of maple leaves, used by the Lieutenant Governor of Nova Scotia

- Arms of the House of Assembly
- Armiger: Charles III in Right of Nova Scotia
- Adopted: 1625, readopted 1929
- Crest: A branch of laurel and a thistle issuing from two hands conjoined, the dexter gauntleted in armour, all proper.
- Shield: Argent a saltire Azure, overall on an escutcheon Or a lion rampant within a double tressure flory-counter-flory Gules.
- Supporters: Dexter a unicorn Argent armed crined and unguled Or, crowned with the Royal Crown of Scotland proper, and gorged with a coronet composed of crosses patté and fleurs-de-lis a chain affixed thereto and reflexed Or, sinister a 17th-century representation of a North American Indian holding in the sinister hand an arrow proper.
- Compartment: A grassy mound Vert set with thistles and mayflowers slipped and leaved proper.
- Motto: MUNIT HAEC ET ALTERA VINCIT; One defends and the other conquers

The coat of arms of Nova Scotia is the heraldic symbol representing the Canadian province of Nova Scotia. It is the oldest provincial achievement of arms in Canada, and the oldest Scottish coat of arms in use outside Scotland. It is blazoned as follows: Argent, a saltire azure charged with an escutcheon of the Royal Arms of Scotland.

The arms were originally granted in 1625 by King Charles I for the first Scottish colony in the Americas. The arms are also borne as a heraldic badge by the Baronets of Nova Scotia, a chivalric order of Scotland and then, from 1707, Great Britain.

They fell out of use when Nova Scotia joined the Confederation in 1867, but were restored in 1929 by royal warrant of King George V.

== History ==
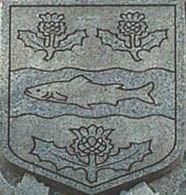
Shield of 1867–1929

The arms were originally granted in 1625 by King Charles I as part of a Scottish settlement attempt in Nova Scotia led by Sir William Alexander. These remained in use until the mid 19th century, appearing on the great seal of the province used prior to Confederation in 1867, after which all the provincial great seals were replaced with new ones delivered in 1868. That for Nova Scotia had a new coat of arms comprising a salmon on a blue band between three thistles, on a gold field. The provincial government disliked this and wanted to continue using the old seal, but the federal government did not initially take the necessary steps to facilitate this. Pressure to restore it grew, and it was reassumed in 1929, with the newer arms being abandoned. The original coat of arms was augmented with a compartment upon the issue of the new royal warrant in 1929.

The 1867–1929 shield was blazoned Or, on a fess wavy azure between three thistles proper a salmon naiant argent.

== Symbolism ==
Crest

Crest
Two hands, one naked and the other clad in armour, holding a thistle, representing Scotland, and laurel, representing peace.
Shield
The shield, a blue saltire on a white field, is a simple reversal of the Scottish flag (a white saltire, Saint Andrew's cross, on a blue field). It is also charged with an escutcheon bearing the Royal arms of Scotland; a gold shield with a red rampant lion in a double border decorated with fleurs de lis.
Compartment
The compartment includes thistles as well as the trailing arbutus or mayflower, the floral emblem of Nova Scotia, added when the arms were reassumed in 1929.
Supporters
The supporters are the unicorn from the royal arms of Scotland which is now borne by the British monarchy, and a member of the Mi'kmaq First Nation indigenous to Nova Scotia, who in the heraldic language of the 17th century was blazoned a "savage." When the grant of arms was registered with the Canadian Heraldic Authority in 2007, the sinister supporter was redescribed as "a 17th century representation of a North American Indian."

Motto
Munit haec et altera vincit ("One [hand] defends and the other conquers"), placed above the shield in the Scottish tradition.

== See also ==
- Symbols of Nova Scotia
- Flag of Nova Scotia
- Coat of arms of the Halifax Regional Municipality
- Canadian heraldry
- National symbols of Canada
- List of Canadian provincial and territorial symbols
