= Symbols of Nova Scotia =

Symbols of Canadian province

Nova Scotia is one of Canada's provinces, and has established several provincial symbols.

== Symbols ==
	Symbol	Image	Adopted	Remarks
Coat of arms	Coat of arms of Nova Scotia	Coat of arms of Nova Scotia	1625	Granted to the Royal Province of Nova Scotia by King Charles I of England, Mayflower added to compartment in 1929.
Motto	Munit haec et altera vincit One defends and the other conquers		1625	
Shield of Arms	Shield of arms of Nova Scotia	Shield of the Arms of Nova Scotia	1625	Shield of arms was granted by King Charles I of England
Flag	Flag of Nova Scotia	Flag of Nova Scotia	1858, restored in 1929	Created in 1858 from Arms granted by King Charles I in 1625, restored by Royal Warrant of George V after confederation.
Crest	The House of Assembly Crest	House of Assembly Crest		Crest is derived from the Shield of Arms with the addition of St. Edward's crown placed at the top of the shield.
Flower	May Flower (Trailing Arbutus); Epigaea repens	trailing arbutus	1901	Emerged as a native patriotic symbol in 1820
Bird	Osprey; Pandion haliaetus	Osprey	1994	400 breeding pairs exist in Nova Scotia.
Tree	Red Spruce; Picea rubens	Red Spruce	1988	Important sawn lumber and pulpwood product in the province.
Berry	Wild Blueberry	Blueberry	January 11, 1996	Native to Nova Scotia
Dog	Nova Scotia Duck-Tolling Retriever	Nova Scotia Duck-Tolling Retriever	1995	A dog breed native to Nova Scotia
Horse	Sable Island horse	Nova Scotia Duck-Tolling Retriever	2008	
Fish	Brook trout	Brook trout	November 23, 2006	
Gemstone	Agate	Agate	November 23, 1999	Found in the basalts around the Bay of Fundy
Mineral	Stilbite	Stilbite		Abundant along the Bay of Fundy and Minas Basin.
Fossil	Hylonomus lyelli "forest wanderer"	Hylonomus lyelli	2002	Is the oldest known reptile in the world.
Maritime ambassador	Bluenose II	Bluenose II		Replica of the schooner Bluenose (1921–1946)
Tartan	Blue, white, greens, red and gold	Tartan of Nova Scotia	1955	Nova Scotia Tartan was the first provincial tartan in Canada and was approved by the Lord Lyon King at Arms. The blue and white in the tartan stand for the sea, the greens represent the forests, red is for the royal lion on the Shield of Arms, and gold for the province's historic Royal Charter.
Mace	Mace of Nova Scotia		1930	It is the ancient symbol of the Royal Authority, delegated in Nova Scotia to the House of Assembly
Logo	The Visual Identity Program Symbol	Visual Identity Program Symbol	1996	The symbol is used by Nova Scotia government departments and the majority of agencies and commissions for stationery, advertising, exhibits and displays as the consistent visual form by which the province identifies itself both within government and to the public: the words "NOVA SCOTIA" (uppercase) surmounted by the Flag of Nova Scotia.
Orders	Order of Nova Scotia	Order of Nova Scotia ribbon	2002	The Order of Nova Scotia is Nova Scotia's highest honour. The medal is in the form of the five-petalled mayflower, at the heart of the flower is the Shield of Arms for Nova Scotia and the shield is surmounted by St. Edward's crown.
