= Coat of arms of Scotland =

Royal Arms of Scotland

Versions
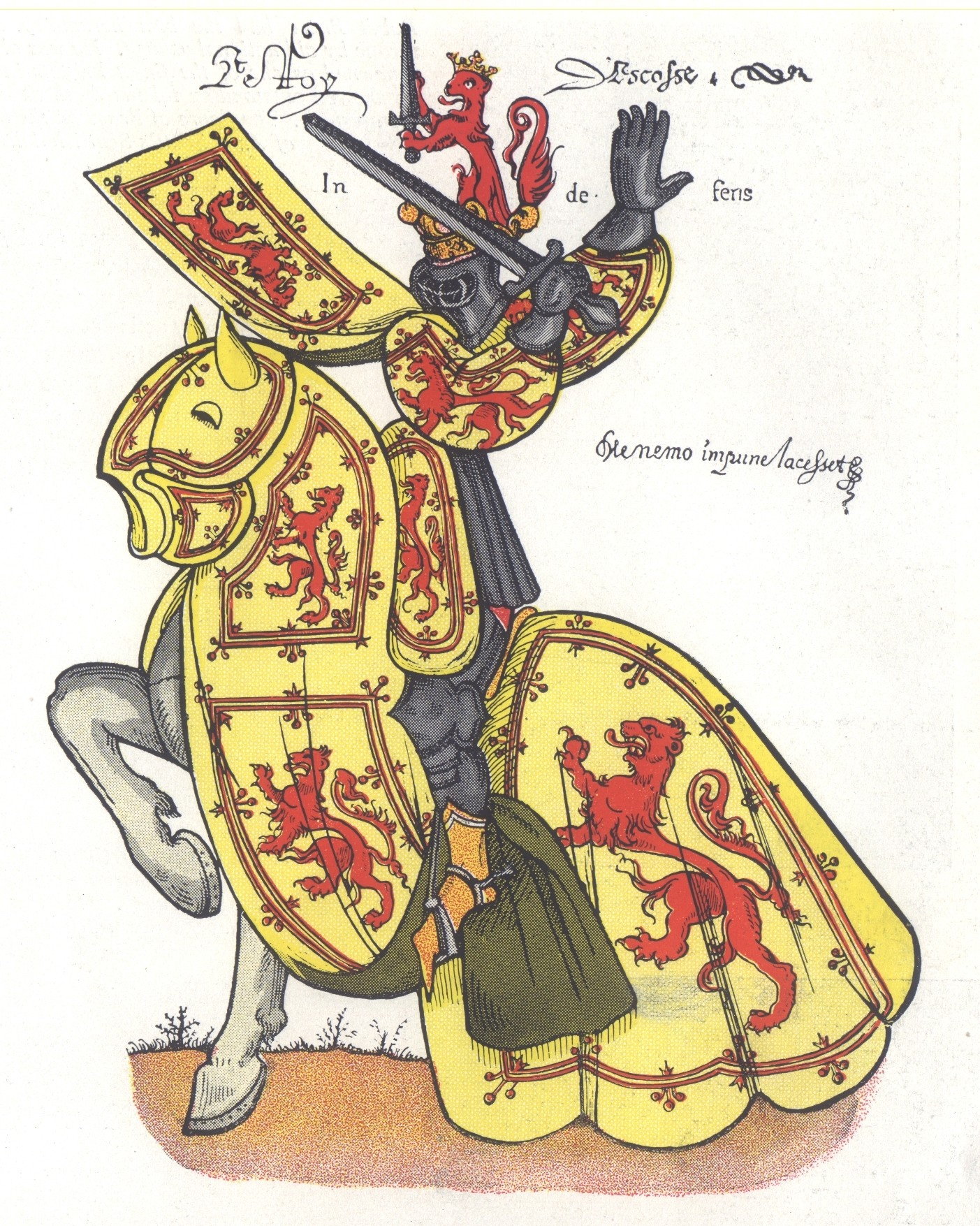
- Heraldic tabard and caparison

- Banner of arms, which serves as the royal standard

- Achievement
- Armiger: Monarchs of Scotland
- Adopted: Late Middle Ages
- Shield: Or a lion rampant Gules armed and langued Azure within a double tressure flory-counter-flory of the second
- Motto: Scots: In My Defens God Me Defend (abbr. In Defens)
- Use: Second quarters of current Royal coat of arms of the United Kingdom; First and fourth quarters of current Royal coat of arms of the United Kingdom for usage in Scotland; Usage granted by the monarch to the First Minister of Scotland; Recognised as one of the National symbols of Scotland

The coat of arms of Scotland, colloquially called the Lion Rampant, is the coat of arms historically used as arms of dominion by the monarchs of the Kingdom of Scotland, and later used within the coat of arms of Great Britain and the present coat of arms of the United Kingdom. The arms consist of a red lion surrounded by a red double border decorated with fleurs-de-lis, all on a gold background. The blazon, or heraldic description, is: Or a lion rampant Gules armed and langued Azure within a double tressure flory-counter-flory of the second.

The coat of arms was adopted in the 12th century by William the Lion and has been used by successive Scottish and British monarchs. It currently forms part of the coat of arms of the United Kingdom, where it is quartered with the arms of England and Ireland. There are two versions of the United Kingdom's arms, one which gives England prominence and other which gives Scotland prominence; the latter includes other Scottish symbolism in the full achievement, such as the collar of the Order of the Thistle.

The coat of arms rarely appears in isolation in royal or government contexts, as the Scottish version of the arms of the United Kingdom are used instead. One exception is the royal banner—the arms in flag form—which can be used by some high-ranking representatives of the monarch in Scotland; this includes the First Minister of Scotland in their capacity as Keeper of the Great Seal of Scotland. The banner is also flown from the Scottish royal residences when the monarch is not present. As the arms are a national symbol of Scotland they are often used to represent the country, for example in the arms of Canada. Elements of the arms are frequently found in the arms of Scottish institutions, such as the Scottish Football Association, University of St Andrews, and Aberdeen City Council.

== Description ==
The arms feature a red rampant lion with blue tongue and claws situated within a red double border decorated with fleurs-de-lis, known as the 'royal tressure'. The fleurs-de-lis in the tressure are traditionally said to represent the "auld alliance" with France, but this is unlikely as there are records of the tressure being used before 1295, when the alliance began. It may have been added to make the arms more distinctive, as a lion rampant is a common heraldic charge.

The arms historically formed part of a full achievement used by the monarchs of Scotland. The exact form of this varied, but in its fullest version it typically included a helm, mantling, crest, two mottoes, supporters, a compartment, and the collar of the Order of the Thistle. The helm faced forwards and had a barred visor. The mantling was often gold with ermine lining, but other colours were used. The crest consisted of a forward-facing red lion, crowned and holding a sword and sceptre, sitting on another crown. These were often stylised to represent the physical crown, sceptre, and sword used by Scottish monarchs, together called the Honours of Scotland. Above the crest was the slogan "In Defens", a contraction of "In My Defens God Me Defend", and surrounding the shield was the collar of the Order of the Thistle. The supporters are two crowned and chained unicorns, each carrying banners. The banner of the dexter supporter was the arms themselves, and that of the sinister supporter the national flag of Scotland. The compartment typically included thistles, the national flower of Scotland, and later versions of the arms also included the motto of the Order of the Thistle, Nemo me impune lacessit.

Most of these elements were retained in the Scottish coat of arms after the Union of the Crowns, and in the Scottish versions of the coat of arms of Great Britain and, later, the United Kingdom. Nevertheless, some changes were made: the sinister supporter was replaced with a crowned lion holding a banner bearing the flag of England, the dexter supporter now bears the flag of Scotland, and the coat of arms changed to reflect that used at the time.

== History ==
=== Kingdom of Scotland ===
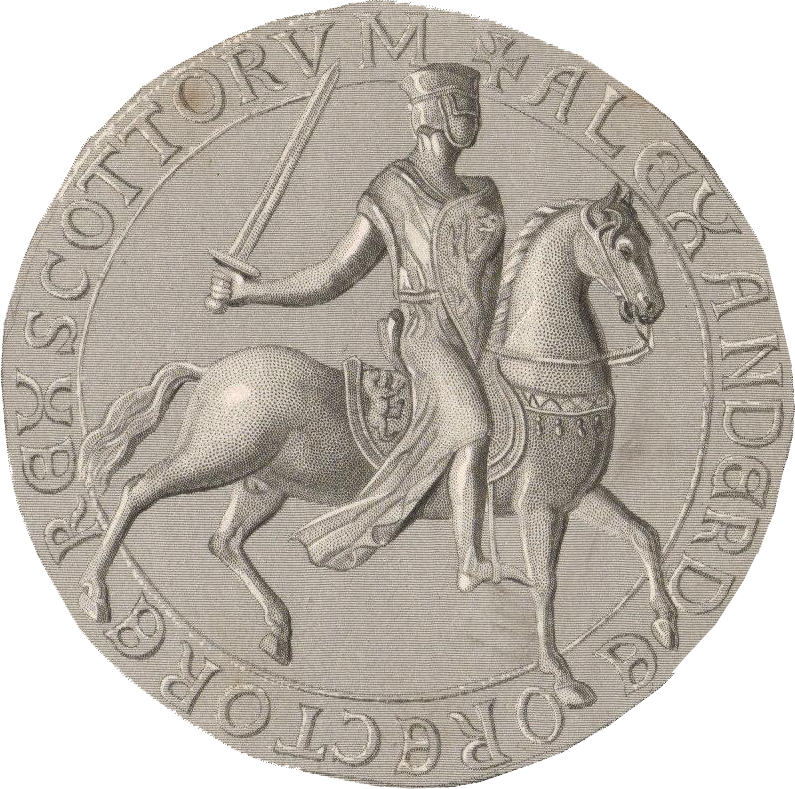
Reverse of Alexander II's Great Seal, displaying the Lion rampant on saddle and shield

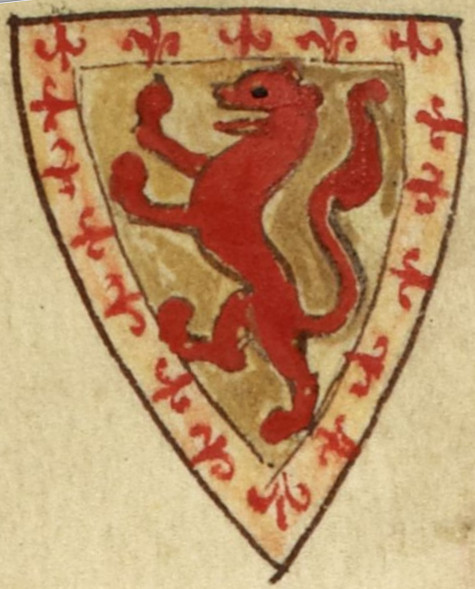
Arms of Alexander II, as shown in Matthew Paris's Historia Anglorum, c. 1250

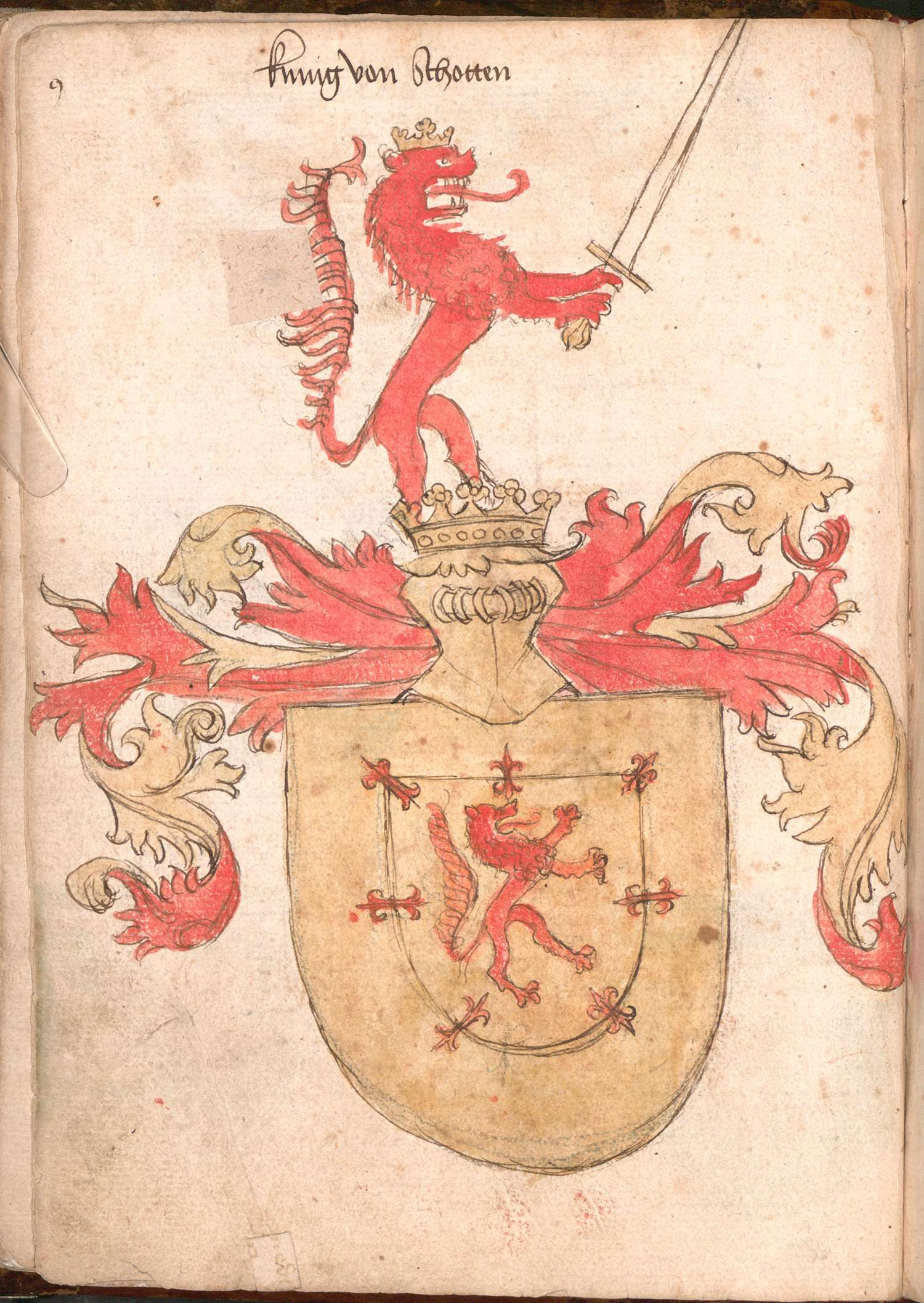
Arms of the King of Scots, from the Wernigerode Armorial, c. 1475

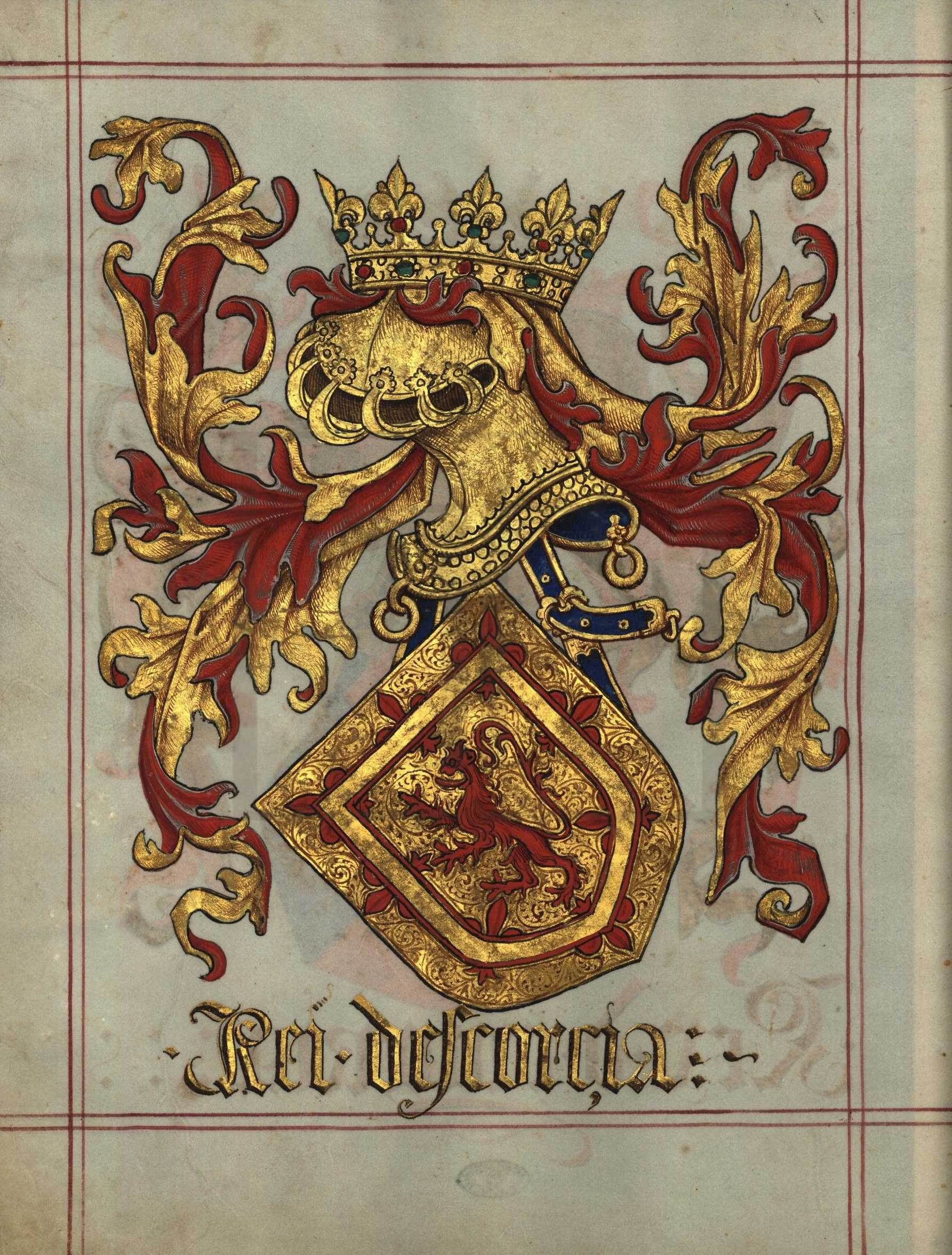
The arms in the Portuguese Livro de Armerio-Mor, c. 1509

A form of these arms was first used by King William the Lion in the 12th century, though no trace of them can be made out on his seal. However, a lion rampant can clearly be made out on the seal of his son, Alexander II. Over the years many writers have claimed them to be much older; even Alexander Nisbet, considered to be one of the more reliable Scottish heralds, claims that a lion was first adopted as a personal symbol by the legendary Fergus, with the royal tressure being added in the reign of Achaius.

Throughout the ages the arms passed from monarch to succeeding monarch with only slight variations in detail. In some early examples the lion holds a sword or wears a crown, and the royal tressure has sometimes been interpreted as an orle or bordure. Many of these relatively minor variations will have resulted from the individual efforts of stonemasons, weavers, artists and sculptors throughout the ages in their attempts to create a facsimile of the arms of the period, as well as mistakes and misinterpretations on the part of foreign heraldic artists.

Until the reign of James I (1406–1437) the Scottish monarchs did not use supporters; James introduced two lion supporters to the depiction of the arms on his privy seal and used a single unicorn elsewhere. The lions continued to be used almost continuously until the Union of the Crowns, the exception being James V, who used two unicorns on his privy seal. His daughter, Mary, Queen of Scots, reverted to the lions but used two unicorns on her great seal, the first monarch to do so. When her son, James VI, inherited the kingdoms of England and Ireland he began using one unicorn and one lion supporter, a practice continued to the present day.

In the reign of James III, the Scottish Parliament made a curious attempt to get rid of the royal tressure, passing an act stating that "the King, with the advice of the three Estates ordained that in time to come there should be no double tressure about his arms, but that he should bear whole arms of the lion without any more". This state of affairs does not appear to have lasted very long, with James III soon re-instating the royal tressure, first without its top, and then in its original form.

Upon the creation of the Public Register of All Arms and Bearings in Scotland in 1672 Charles II registered the blazon of the achievement of the King of Scots as:

"Or, a Lyon rampant gules armed and langued azure within a double tressur flowered and counter-flowered with flowers de lis of the second, Encircled with the order of Scotland the same being composed of Rue and thistles having the Image of St. Andrew with his crosse on his brest y unto pendent. Above the shield ane Helment answerable to his Majesties high qualitie and jurisdiction with a mantle or doubled ermine adorned with ane Imperiall Crowne beautified with crosses pattee and flowers de lis surmounted on the top for his Majesties Crest of a Lyon sejant full faced gules crowned or holding in his dexter paw a naked sword proper and in the sinister a Scepter both erected paleways supported be two Unicornes Argent crowned with Imperiall and goarged with open Crownes, to the last chains affixed passing betwixt their fore leggs and reflexed over their backs or, he on the dexter imbracing and bearing up a banner of cloath of gold charged with the Royall Armes of Scotland and he on the sinister another Banner azure charged with a St Andrews Crosse argent, both standing on ane compartment placed underneath from which issue thistles one towards each side of the escutcheon, and for his Majisties Royall Motto's in ane escroll over all In defence, and under on the table of the compartment Nemo me impune Lacessit."

=== Kingdom of France ===
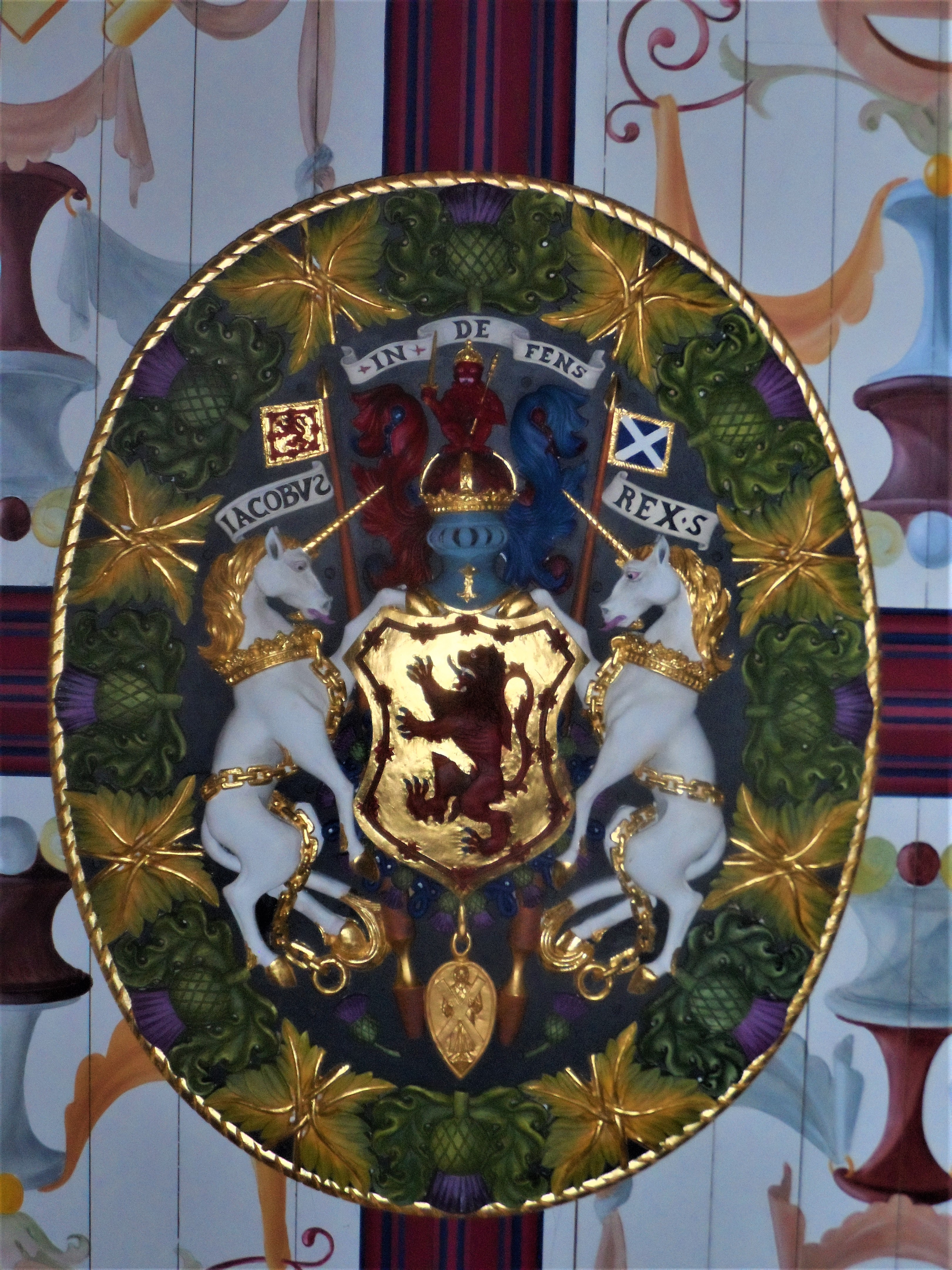
Royal arms in Stirling Castle with Order of the Thistle

When Mary, Queen of Scots married Francis, Dauphin of France, in 1558, Mary's Royal arms of Scotland were impaled with those of the Dauphin, whose arms were themselves quartered with those of Scotland to indicate his status as King consort of Scotland. Following the death of Mary I of England in November 1558, the Scottish queen briefly claimed the English crown and quartered the Scottish arms with the royal arms of England, while the Dauphin added the English arms as an escutcheon to his coat, but this claim was renounced in 1560 and the English arms not used thereafter. When Francis ascended to the throne of the Kingdom of France in 1559 as King Francis II, his arms were altered to indicate his status as King of France, with those of Mary also being altered to reflect her elevated status as Queen consort of France.

Following the death of Francis in 1560, Mary continued to use the arms showing Scotland and France impaled, (with a minor alteration of the arms to reflect her change of status from queen-consort to Queen dowager), until her marriage to Henry, Lord Darnley, in 1565. (Such symbolism was not lost upon Queen Elizabeth I of England, given that the English monarchy had for centuries held a historical claim to the throne of France, symbolised by the arms of France having been quartered with those of England since 1340). Following the marriage to Darnley, the arms of Scotland reverted to the blazon which had preceded the marriage to Francis.

=== Union of the Crowns ===
Royal coat of arms of Scotland

Versions
- Coat of arms of James VI from 1603 as both the King of Scots and as King James I of England, France, and Ireland.
- Armiger: James VI, King of Scots, ultimate armiger of pre-1603 version
- Adopted: Late Middle Ages
- Crest: Upon the Royal helm the crown of Scotland Proper, thereon a lion sejant affronté Gules armed and langued Azure, imperially crowned Proper holding in his dexter paw a sword and in his sinister a sceptre, both Proper
- Shield: Or a lion rampant Gules armed and langued Azure within a double tressure flory-counter-flory of the second
- Supporters: Unicorns Argent imperially crowned Proper, armed, crined and unguled Or, gorged with a coronet of the second composed of crosses patée and fleurs de lis a chain affixed thereto passing between the forelegs and reflexed over the back also of the second. Sinister holding the standard of Saint Andrew, dexter holding the banner of the Royal arms
- Compartment: a compartment underneath from which issue thistles one towards each side of the escutcheon
- Motto: Scots: In My Defens God Me Defend (abbr. In Defens)
- Order: The Most Ancient and Most Noble Order of the Thistle. (Arms feature the collar of the order)

On the death of Queen Elizabeth I of England in 1603, James VI inherited the thrones of England and Ireland. The arms of England were quartered with those of Scotland, and a quarter for Ireland was also added. At this time the King of England also laid claim to the French throne, therefore the arms of the Kingdom of England were themselves already quartered with those of the Kingdom of France. James used a different version of his royal arms in Scotland and this distinction in royal protocol continued post the Acts of Union of 1707. (Today, the Royal Arms of the United Kingdom used in Scotland continue to differ from those used elsewhere).

During the reign of King Charles II, the royal arms used in Scotland were augmented with the inclusion of the Latin motto of the Order of the Thistle, the highest Chivalric order of the Kingdom of Scotland. The motto of the Order of the Thistle, Nemo me impune lacessit, appears on a blue scroll overlying the compartment. (Previously, only the collar of the Order of the Thistle had appeared on the arms).

The addition by King Charles of Nemo me impune lacessit ensured that the blazon of his Royal arms used in Scotland complemented that of his Royal arms used elsewhere, in that two mottoes were displayed. The blazon used elsewhere had included the French motto of the arms, Dieu et mon droit, together with the Old French motto of the Order of the Garter, the highest Chivalric order of the Kingdom of England. The motto of the Order of the Garter, Honi soit qui mal y pense, appears on a representation of the garter surrounding the shield. Henceforth, the versions of the Royal arms used in Scotland and elsewhere were to include both the motto of the arms of the respective kingdom and the motto of the associated order of chivalry.

From the accession of the Stuart dynasty to the throne of the Kingdom of Ireland in 1603, the Royal Arms have featured the harp, or Cláirseach, of Ireland in the third quadrant, the style of the harp itself having been altered several times since. The position of King of Ireland ceased with the passage by the Oireachtas of the Republic of Ireland Act 1948, when the office of President of Ireland (which had been created in late 1937) replaced that of the King of Ireland for external as well as internal affairs. The Act declared that the Irish state could be described as a republic, following which the newly created Republic of Ireland left the British Commonwealth. However, the modern versions of the Royal Arms of the United Kingdom of Great Britain and Northern Ireland used both in Scotland and elsewhere, and also the arms of Canada, continue to feature an Irish harp to represent Northern Ireland.

=== Changes to the blazon of the arms ===
- Following the marriage of Mary, Queen of Scots, in 1558, the blazon of the royal arms of Scotland included elements from the arms of:

The Dauphin of France, (1558–1559)
The Kingdom of England, (1558-1560)
The Kingdom of France, (1559–1565)

- Following the Union of the Crowns in 1603, the blazon of the royal arms of Scotland included elements from the arms of:

The Kingdom of France, (1603–1707)
The Kingdom of England, (1603–1707)
The Kingdom of Ireland, (1603–1707)

- Following the reign of Charles II, King of Scots, the blazon of the royal arms of Scotland included upon a blue scroll overlying the compartment, the motto of The Most Ancient and Most Noble Order of the Thistle; Nemo me impune lacessit, and elements from the arms of:

The House of Orange-Nassau, (1689–1702)

- Following the Acts of Union of 1707, the blazon of the royal arms of Great Britain used in Scotland included elements from the arms of:

The Kingdom of France, (1707–1800)
The Kingdom of Ireland (1707–1800)
The Electorate of Hanover, (1714–1800)

- Following the Act of Union of 1800, the blazon of the royal arms of the United Kingdom used in Scotland included elements from the arms of:

The Electorate of Hanover, (1801–1814)
The Kingdom of Hanover, (1814–1837)

- Following the accession of Queen Victoria in 1837, the modern royal arms of the United Kingdom were adopted.
Arms of Scotland

Arms of England

Arms of France

Arms of the Dauphin of France

France and England quarterly

Arms of Ireland

Arms of the House of Orange-Nassau

Arms of the House of Hanover

== Development ==
The development of the royal arms from 1214 to 1603:

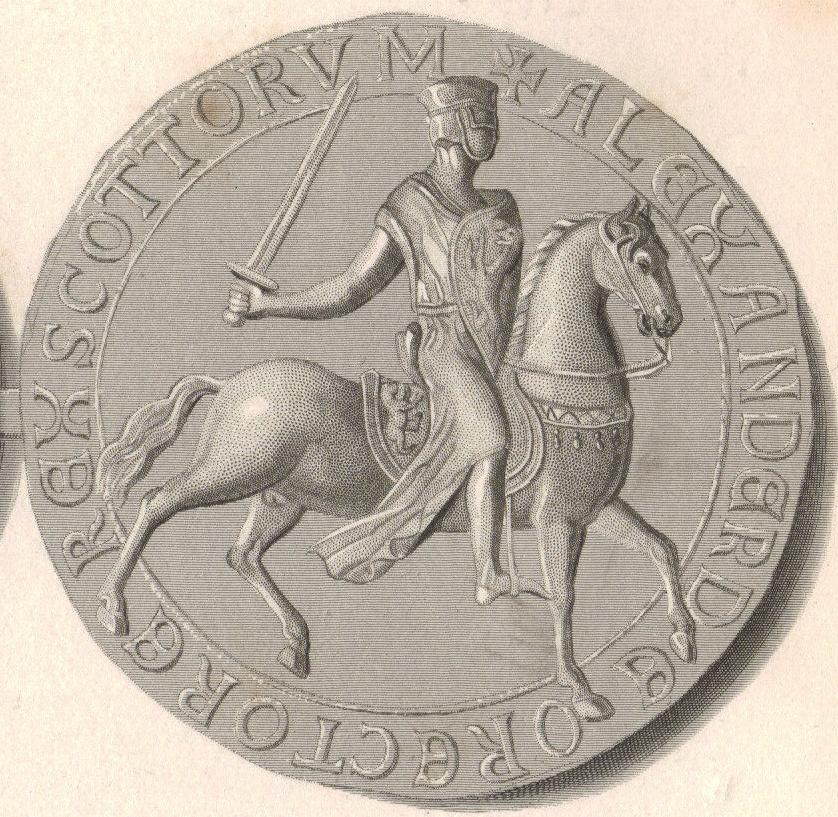
Arms	Dates	Details
	1214–1249	Reverse of Alexander II's Great Seal, displaying the Lion rampant on saddle and shield.
	Before 1558	A red lion, rampant, on a yellow field within a double royal tressure, flory counter-flory.
	1558	Mary, Queen of Scots, Dauphine of France, impaled with arms of Francis, Dauphin of France.
	1558–1559	Mary, Queen of Scots, Dauphine of France, impaled with the dimidated arms of Francis, Dauphin of France, as King consort of Scots.
	1559	Mary, Queen of Scots, Dauphine of France, impaled with the dimidated arms of Francis, Dauphin of France, King consort of Scots, both halves incorporating the claim to the English throne made for a short time.
	1559–1560	Mary, Queen of Scots and Queen consort of France
	1560–1565	Mary, Queen of Scots and Queen dowager of France.
	1565–1603	Upon her second marriage to Henry Stuart, Lord Darnley, in 1565, Mary discontinued use of the France impalement, reverting to the arms of the Kingdom of Scotland. King James VI was the last monarch of Scotland to use these arms before the Union of the Crowns in 1603.
	1603–1652 1660–1689	James VI quarted the Scottish arms with those of the kingdoms of England and Ireland after inheriting both in 1603. The arms were not used during the Commonwealth or the Protectorate, which existed in Scotland from 1654 to 1660 and during which the monarchy was abolished.
	1689–1694	In 1689 James II was deposed and replaced with his daughter Mary II and her husband William III, who ruled as co-monarchs. They impaled their arms, which were identical except that William bore the arms with an inescutcheon of Nassau, the royal house to which he belonged: Azure billetty or, a lion rampant of the last armed and langued gules.
	1694–1702	After Mary II's death, William III used his arms alone.
	1702–1707	Anne used the 1603 version of the arms until the creation of the Kingdom of Great Britain in 1707.
For the later coats of arms of British monarchs, see Coat of arms of Great Britain and Coat of arms of the United Kingdom.

== As a banner ==
Royal Banner of Scotland

Since the formation of the Kingdom of Great Britain, the Scottish arms are now generally used in combination with the arms of England and Ireland. However, the original royal banner of Scotland, also known as the "Lion Rampant", continues to be used officially in Scotland; being flown from royal residences when the King is not in residence and used in an official capacity by the First Minister, Lord High Commissioner to the General Assembly of the Church of Scotland, Lord Lyon King of Arms and lords lieutenant in their lieutenancies. Unofficially, the royal banner is often used as a secondary national flag, being most often seen at sporting events involving Scottish national teams. (Both the Scottish Football Association and Scotland national football team use a logo based upon the royal arms).

== Current uses ==
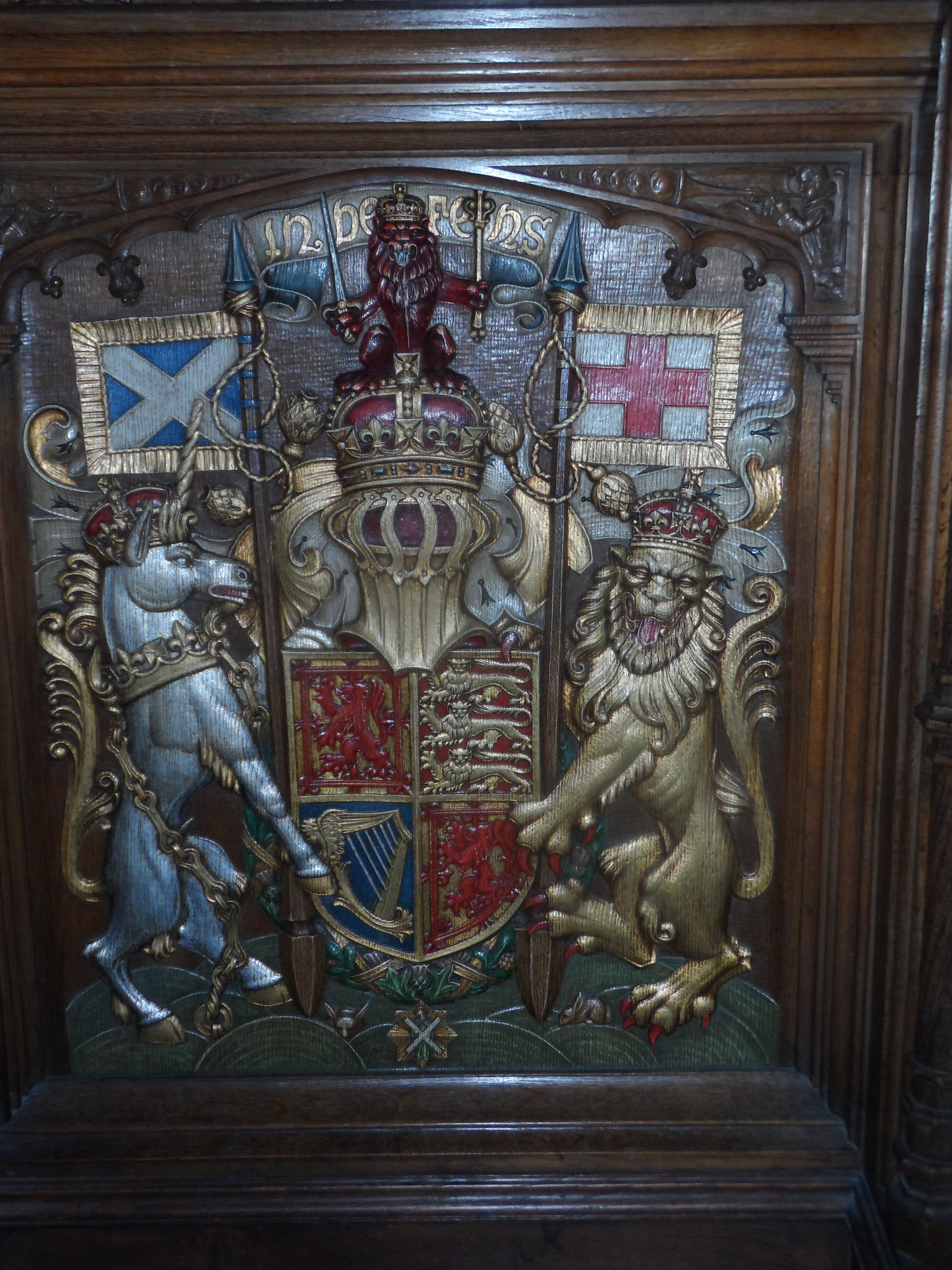
Royal arms in the Thistle Chapel, St Giles' Cathedral, Edinburgh

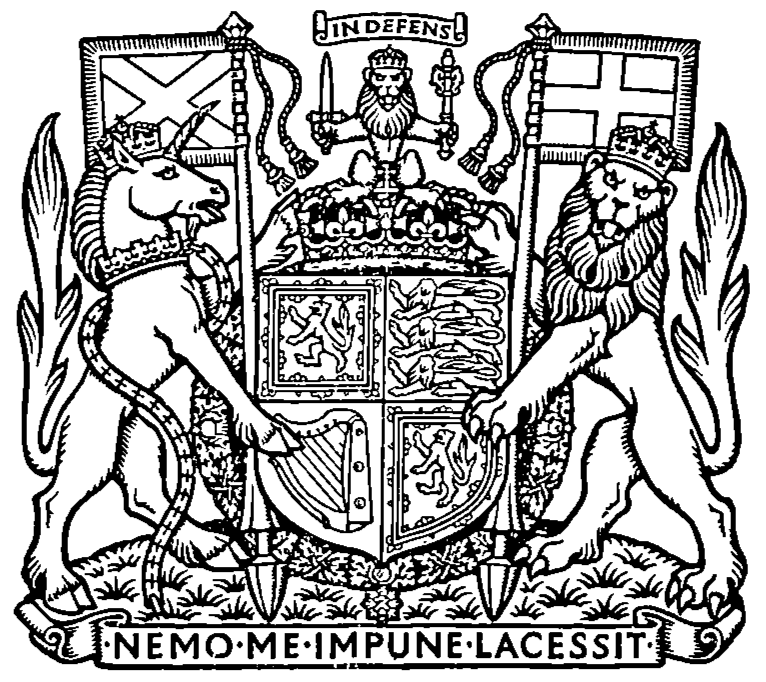
Version displayed on Acts of the Scottish Parliament

The royal arms in their current form were adopted on the accession of Queen Victoria in 1837. They show the Scottish arms in the first and fourth quarters of the shield, with the English arms in the second quarter and the Irish in the third. The Scots motto In Defens appears as in the original arms, and the Latin motto of the Order of the Thistle, Nemo me impune lacessit, also appears on a blue scroll overlying the compartment. The Scottish unicorn and English lion hold lances flying the banners of St Andrew and St George, in imitation of the two unicorns in the original arms. The unicorn is placed in the dominant position on the dexter side, and the shield is encircled by the collar of the Order of the Thistle instead of the Garter.

The arms of the Duke of Rothesay quarter the arms of the Great Steward of Scotland, with the arms of the Lord of the Isles. In the centre, on an inescutcheon, are the arms of the heir apparent to the King of Scots, namely the royal arms of Scotland with a three-pointed label.

The coat of arms of the Government of Gibraltar correspond to the British royal arms in that they also feature the Scottish arms in the second quarter of the shield and use the unicorn as the sinister supporter, with Gibraltar's own coat of arms under the motto Dieu et mon droit.

The royal arms of Canada correspond to the British royal arms in that they also feature the Scottish arms in the second quarter of the shield and use the unicorn as the sinister supporter. The Canadian version also mirrors the Scottish version in that each supporter not only supports the shield but also a lance displaying a flag.

Both the flag and arms of Nova Scotia feature elements of the Scottish arms. However, unlike the royal arms of Canada, those of Nova Scotia portray the unicorn as the imperially crowned dexter supporter, in the Scottish style. The shield depicts an inverse representation of the flag of Scotland and features the Royal arms of Scotland on an inescutcheon. The motto munit hæc et altera vincit appears above the crest in keeping with the Scottish heraldic style. (Both the flag and shield of the lieutenant governor of Nova Scotia also feature the Scottish arms on an inescutcheon).

The royal tressure appears on the arms of numerous Scottish families and institutions as a mark of royal favour, known in heraldry as an augmentation of honour; prominent examples occur in the arms of the cities of Perth and Aberdeen. In England, the royal tressure is found on the arms of the Metropolitan Police. In 2002, the Queen granted arms to the Monarchist League of Canada which featured a royal tressure with maple leaves instead of the usual fleurs-de-lis. A royal tressure with roses and thistles can be found in the arms of the Marquis of Aberdeen and Temair.

The arms of the Archdiocese of Mechelen used to be the same as those of Scotland. They were quartered with the arms of the city of Brussels in 1961 when it became the Archdiocese of Mechelen-Brussels. The reason for the use of the Scottish arms is debated. One theory for them being used is that Saint Rumbold, the patron saint of Mechelen, was an Irish monk and in medieval times Irish monks were called Scotii, and thus later the arms of Scotland were taken as arms for the saint. Another theory is that Saint Rumbold was the son of a Scottish King and thus his arms were identical to the Scottish arms.

The coat of arms of the town of Sankt Wendel in Saarland combines elements of the Scottish flag and the Scottish coat of arms. Four lilies, taken from the Scottish royal coat of arms, on a blue background, are reminiscent of Saint Wendelin. Legendary tradition describes him as a Scottish king's son. In 1465, the parish of St. Wendel sent two parishioners to Scotland to research the legend of Saint Wendelin's royal Scottish origins. After allegedly positive confirmation, the Scottish lion coat of arms was used in the seal of the parish of St. Wendel. The blue-silver/white flag of Sankt Wendel takes up the blue background of the coat of arms of the city and the silver/white of its lilies as well as the colors of the Scottish flag.

Arms of King Charles III used in Scotland

Arms of Prince William, Duke of Rothesay used in Scotland

Arms of the Province of Nova Scotia

Arms of the Archdiocese of Mechelen-Brussels

Coat of arms of the Saarland town of Sankt Wendel in Germany

== See also ==
- Coat of arms of the United Kingdom
- Great Seal of Scotland
- Honours of Scotland
- Scottish heraldry
- Court of the Lord Lyon
- Unicorn (coin)
