= Robert Edward Harris =

Chief Justice of Nova Scotia from 1918–1931

Robert Edward Harris (18 August 1860 – 30 May 1931) was a Canadian businessman, lawyer, and judge. He was the Chief Justice of Nova Scotia from 1918 until his death in 1931. Harris was the donor of the Mace of the Province of Nova Scotia in March 1930.
