= Flag of New Brunswick =

Canadian provincial flag

New Brunswick
- Use: Civil and state flag
- Proportion: 5∶8
- Adopted: February 24, 1965; 61 years ago
- Designed by: Robert Pichette and Alan B. Beddoe

The flag of New Brunswick (French: le drapeau du Nouveau-Brunswick) consists of a golden lion passant on a red field in the upper third and a gold field defaced with a lymphad on top of blue and white wavy lines in the bottom two-thirds. Adopted in 1965 shortly after the new national flag was inaugurated, it has been the flag of the Canadian province since February 24 of that year. It is a banner of arms modelled after the province's coat of arms.

== History ==
New Brunswick's flag is an armorial banner of the shield on its coat of arms.

New Brunswick acquiesced to a federation with the other colonies of Nova Scotia and the United Province of Canada in 1867 under the British North America Act to form the Dominion of Canada. A year later, Queen Victoria issued a Royal Warrant on May 26 allowing the new province to use its own coat of arms. At the time, this consisted solely of a shield, with the crest, supporters, and motto added throughout the latter half of the 20th century.

It was not until 1965 that the Government of New Brunswick resolved to introduce an unprecedented "distinctive provincial flag". This was done shortly after the Canadian Red Ensign, which had been used unofficially as the national flag, was replaced on February 15, 1965, by a new design featuring a maple leaf. There were still parts of Canada where imperial nostalgia was strong, and ruing the demise of the Red Ensign, they sought to have it modified as a provincial flag; this occurred in Ontario (1965) and Manitoba (1966). In New Brunswick, the parliamentary opposition party – the Progressive Conservatives at that time – had plans to table a motion approving the Red Ensign as the new provincial flag, which would have had particularly detrimental ramifications given the province's history of French and British settlement. Although the British had forcibly removed the Acadians from present-day New Brunswick during the mid-18th century, some of them returned after the deportations ended. Consequently, the province was still strongly divided by language, ethnicity, and religion, with English-speaking descendants of British colonists and Loyalists forming the majority and French-speaking Acadians comprising a sizeable minority of approximately 35%.

The Premier of New Brunswick in 1965 was Louis Robichaud, the first Acadian elected to lead the province. (Note: Premier Peter Veniot was New Brunswick's first Acadian head of government, but he was never elected as such. He became premier after his predecessor resigned, and served out the remainder of the term from 1923 until his party's defeat in the 1925 provincial election.) Naturally, his government was expected to vote against the motion, which would have had the effect of "unavoidably alienating" considerable number of New Brunswickers. Wanting to avoid a repeat of the divisive debate that had taken place on a national level, the provincial government sought to declare an alternative design as the provincial flag before the Opposition could. The task fell to Robert Pichette, a 28-year-old administrative assistant to Premier Robichaud who also had strong interest in heraldry.

"To me it says New Brunswick. It is not French, it Is not English, it is not anything else, it is just New Brunswick and that is very much what I had in mind."

— Robert Pichette reflecting on what the flag evokes in an interview 50 years after it was adopted.

Pichette worked in secret for three weeks on the design; he took inspiration from New Brunswick's coat of arms and decided to make an armorial banner out of it, in what was described as "a striking new artistic interpretation" by vexillologist Whitney Smith. Although Pichette had adhered to the laws of heraldry, it was still rare for a country or their constituent entities to model their flag after their coat of arms. After he finished a rough draft of his intended end product, Pichette forwarded it to his friend Alan Beddoe – the country's "leading heraldic artist" who designed the Pearson Pennant that was considered for the new national flag – as well as Conrad Swan of the College of Arms in London. Beddoe replied on January 20, enclosing the first sketch of the future flag.

"The symbols on this flag tell the story of the romance of our history. Steeped as we are in the traditions of pioneering ancestors, this flag also embodies the pride of our future. This beautiful flag, granted to us by Queen Victoria, will be a link between our storied past and our bright future."

— Premier Louis Robichaud, during the official introduction of the flag on March 25, 1965.

Two full-sized prototypes were commissioned from a manufacturer based in Toronto. Upon seeing the proposed design for the first time, Premier Robichaud suggested the addition of oars to the galley. A seamstress in Fredericton then stitched this final modification to the banner. Despite the fact that the Royal Warrant permitted the straightforward inauguration of the new flag, an Order in Council was nonetheless promulgated by the province's Lieutenant Governor on February 24, 1965. The new flag was officially unveiled on March 25, at the Legislative Assembly of New Brunswick.

In a 2001 online survey conducted by the North American Vexillological Association, New Brunswick's flag ranked within the top quarter of state, provincial and territorial flags from Canada, the United States, and select current and former territories of the United States. It finished in 18th place out of 72.

== Design ==
=== Description ===
The flag of New Brunswick has an aspect ratio of 5:8. (Note: The official proportions of the flag are "four by length and two and one-half by width". However, the figures are increased by a factor of two so that both are whole numbers.) The official colour scheme, according to the website of the Government of New Brunswick, follows the Pantone Matching System as indicated below. The colour numbers for the flag's black and white shades are not specified.

New Brunswick flag colours
Colour	Pantone	RGB values	Hex
Yellow	116	255-205-0	#FFCD00
Red	186	200-16-46	#C8102E
Blue	286	0-51-160	#0033A0

=== Symbolism ===
The Royal Arms of England (left) and the coat of arms of the Duchy of Brunswick-Lüneburg (right) feature gold lions on red fields that inspired the same design on New Brunswick's flag.

The colours and symbols of the flag carry cultural, political, and regional meanings. According to Whitney Smith, the gold lion in the upper third of the flag alludes to either the Royal Arms of England or the coat of arms of the Duchy of Brunswick-Lüneburg. Both states had ties to New Brunswick – the former was its colonial ruler from 1713 until Confederation in 1867, while the latter lends its name to the province. On the other hand, the lymphad occupying the bottom two thirds of the flag may be evoking New Brunswick's historical shipbuilding industry or the ships utilized by numerous Loyalists to land in the province after they fled the United States in the aftermath of the American Revolutionary War. Although shipbuilding was New Brunswick's dominant economic activity at the time the coat of arms was assigned, the industry declined significantly after Confederation, leading to a period of recession in the province.

=== Similarities ===
The gold lion on a red field has a conspicuous resemblance to that of both the Royal Arms of England – which features three lions with a red backdrop – and the coat of arms of the Duchy of Brunswick-Lüneburg, which has the same background colour but depicts only two lions. This is due to New Brunswick's aforementioned historical connections to these regions.

== Protocol ==
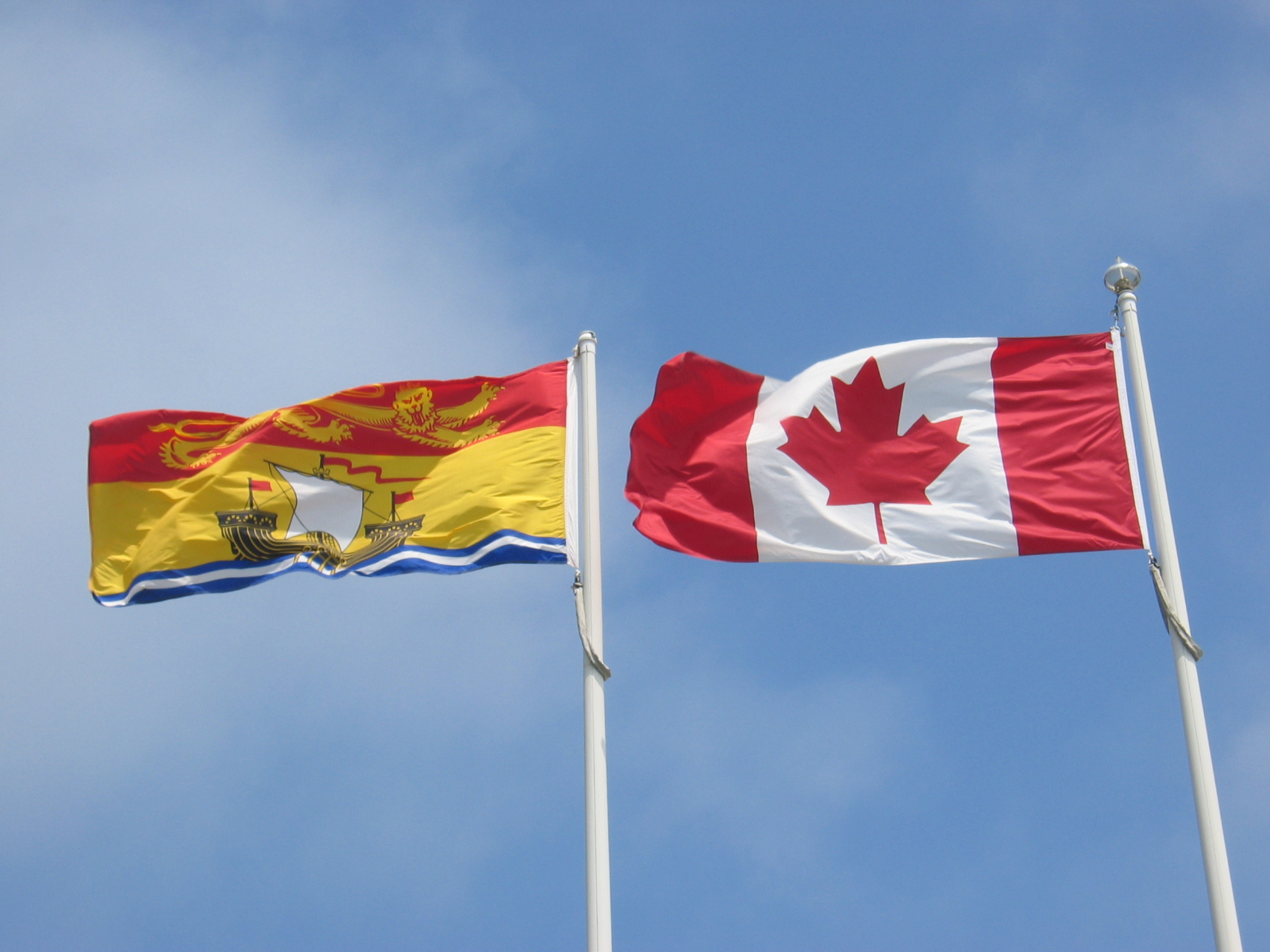
The New Brunswick flag (left) flying alongside the Canadian flag in Grand Bay–Westfield.

Advice regarding flag etiquette is the responsibility of the province's Office of Protocol. When flown together with the flag of Canada and the other provincial and territorial flags, the flag of New Brunswick is fifth in the order of precedence (after the national flag and, in descending order of precedence, the flags of Ontario, Quebec, and Nova Scotia). Even though New Brunswick entered into Confederation on the same date as those three provinces (July 1, 1867), it is placed last among the group since its size of population at the time was the smallest.

== See also ==
- Coat of arms of New Brunswick
- Symbols of New Brunswick
