= Coat of arms of New Brunswick =

Canadian provincial heraldic symbol

Arms of His Majesty The King in Right of New Brunswick

Versions
- Shield

- For use by the Lieutenant Governor of New Brunswick
- Armiger: Charles III in Right of New Brunswick
- Adopted: 1868, augmented 1966 and 1984
- Crest: Upon a helm with wreath or and gules within a coronet comprising 4 maple leaves (3 manifest) set upon a rim of water barry wavy azure and argent leaping an atlantic salmon, upholding on its back our Royal Crown, both proper mantled gules doubled Or.
- Shield: Or, on waves barry wavy azure and argent, a lymphad proper, on a chief gules, a lion passant guardant Or
- Supporters: On either side a white tailed deer, each gorged with a collar of Maliseet wampum, proper and pendant an escutcheon, that to the dexter bearing our union badge and that to the sinister the arms Azure 3 fleurs-de-lis Or, otherwise France modern.
- Compartment: Comprising a grassy mount with the floral emblem of the said Province of New Brunswick, the purple violet and young ostrich fern (commonly called fiddlehead) growing all proper.
- Motto: SPEM REDUXIT [It] has restored hope

The original coat of arms of New Brunswick was granted to New Brunswick by a Royal Warrant of Queen Victoria on 26 May 1868. The provincial flag is a banner of the arms.

== History ==
The original coat of arms, consisting solely of the shield, was based on the design of the Great Seal of New Brunswick, which featured a sailing ship.

The achievement of arms was augmented with crest and motto by an Order in Council of then-Lieutenant Governor John Babbitt McNair in 1966. The supporters and compartment were added by Royal Warrant of Queen Elizabeth II on 24 September 1984, and presented to the province in a public ceremony in Fredericton the following day to mark the province's bicentennial.

== Symbolism ==
Crest

The crest, an Atlantic salmon that is leaping, sits on a golden helmet and a coronet of maple leaves, and is marked with St. Edward's crown, all three symbols of royal authority.

Shield

The shield features a lion passant in chief, commemorating both England (whose arms feature three such lions) and Brunswick (whose arms have two). The principal charge is an ancient galley, symbolizing the maritime province's links to the sea.

Duchy of Brunswick

Kingdom of England

Kingdom of England

Compartment

The compartment is covered by the provincial flower, the purple violet, and the fiddlehead, an edible fern that grows in New Brunswick.

Supporters

The supporters are white-tailed deer collared with Maliseet wampum, and bear badges of the Union colours and of the fleurs-de-lis of royal France, to commemorate the colonization of the area by those powers.

Motto

The motto, Spem reduxit means "Hope Restored", refers to the province's having acted as a haven for Loyalist refugees who fled there after the American Revolution.

== See also ==
- Symbols of New Brunswick
- Flag of New Brunswick
- Canadian heraldry
- National symbols of Canada
- List of Canadian provincial and territorial symbols
