= Flag of Nova Scotia =

Canadian provincial flag

Nova Scotia
- Use: Civil and state flag
- Proportion: 1:2
- Adopted: 1929 (royal warrant); 2013 (provincial statute)
- Design: A white field with a blue diagonal cross that extends to the corners of the flag and the royal arms of Scotland superimposed at the centre of the cross.

The flag of Nova Scotia consists of a blue saltire on a white field defaced with the royal arms of Scotland. Adopted in 1929 after a royal warrant was issued, it has been the flag of the province since January 19 of that year. It is a banner of arms modelled after the province's coat of arms. Utilized as a pennant since 1858, it was officially recognized under primary legislation as Nova Scotia's flag in 2013. When flown with the flags of other Canadian provinces and the national flag, it is fourth in the order of precedence.

== History ==
Colonists from the Kingdom of Scotland first settled in modern-day Nova Scotia after 1621, when James VI and I (The sixth King of Scots and the first King of England and Ireland to bear that name) conferred the land to William Alexander, 1st Earl of Stirling, via royal charter and gave it the Latin name for "New Scotland". Four years later, the colony was granted its own coat of arms by Charles I, with the emblem first recorded at the Court of the Lord Lyon in Edinburgh on May 28, 1625. Towards the end of that decade, the Scots established two short-lived settlements which were ultimately unsuccessful. Both the Kingdom of France and the Kingdom of England sought to take advantage of the failure of the Scottish colony and the territory subsequently changed hands between those two kingdoms repeatedly throughout the remainder of the 17th and into the early 18th centuries. The Peace of Utrecht in 1713 saw the Kingdom of France permanently relinquish mainland Nova Scotia to the recently created Kingdom of Great Britain.

The flag of Nova Scotia was reportedly first flown on its merchant vessels during the Age of Sail in the 19th century, however vexillologist Whitney Smith opines that these ambiguous accounts are doubtful. The first documented usage of the coat of arms of Nova Scotia as a banner of arms was in June 1858 during a celebratory tribute at a cricket club, as stated by an article in the Acadian Recorder at the time and recounted in the Provincial Flag Act. Nova Scotia later acquiesced to a federation with the other colonies of New Brunswick and the United Province of Canada in 1867 under the British North America Act to form the Dominion of Canada. There was vociferous sentiment against Confederation in some parts of Nova Scotia, with a few of its residents flying flags at half-mast on July 1, 1867. The four provinces comprising the new Dominion were allocated individual coats of arms. However, the College of Arms, the heraldic authority in England, was apparently unaware of the earlier grant of arms to Nova Scotia in 1625 by the Lyon Court, the heraldic authority in Scotland. Consequently, Queen Victoria issued a Royal Warrant on May 26 of the following year, conferring a different coat of arms on the new province. This consisted of a salmon and three thistles.

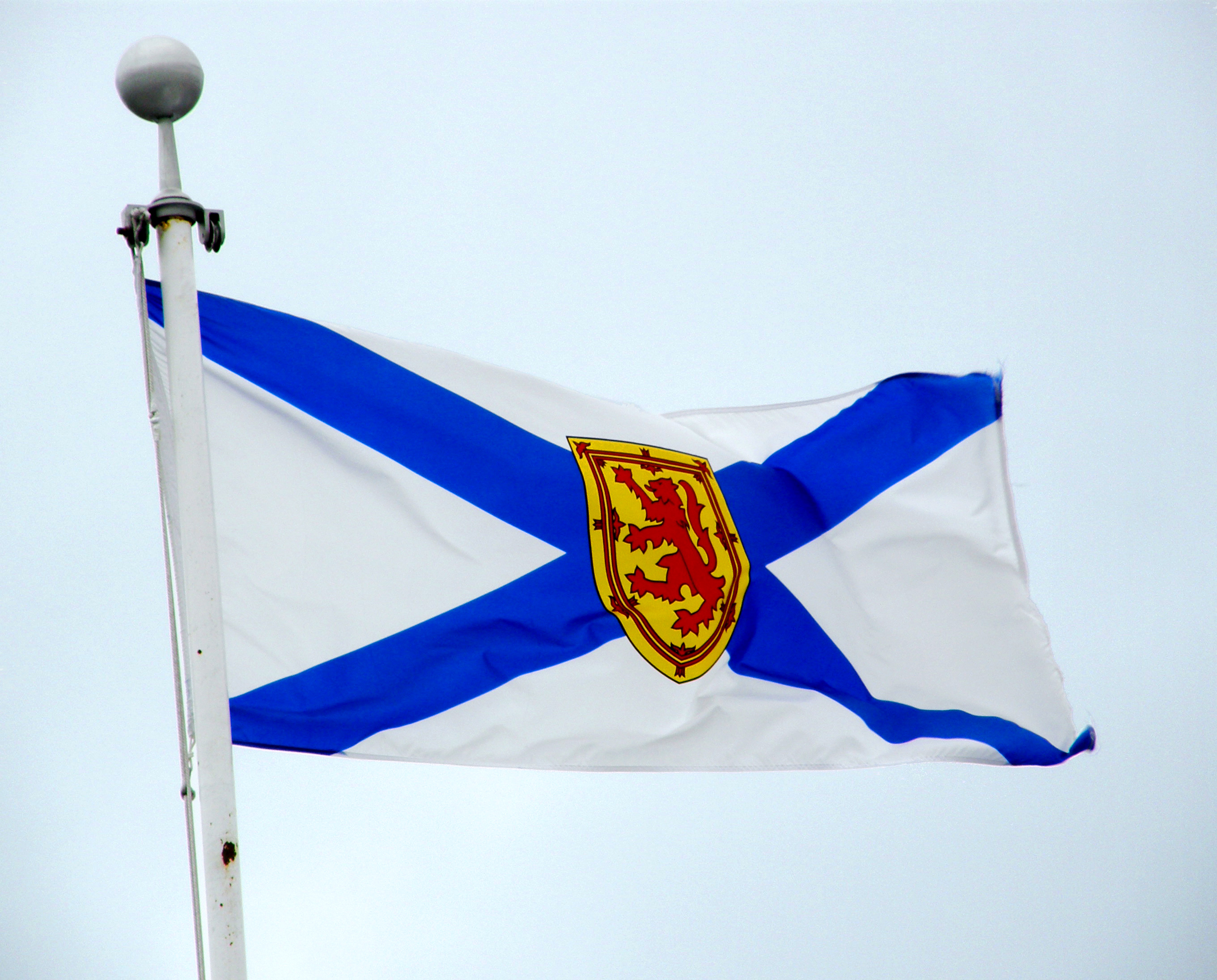
The Nova Scotia flag in Amherst.

The new coat of arms, however, did not become popular in Nova Scotia. As a result, an Order in Council was promulgated by the province's Lieutenant Governor on March 7, 1928, asking for the reinstatement of the 1625 arms. A Royal Warrant was subsequently issued by George V on January 19, 1929, granting the request. It was the first flag in the overseas Commonwealth to be approved by royal charter – thus purportedly making it the oldest flag of a Dominion – and is the oldest provincial flag in Canada. However, it is not the first Canadian provincial flag to be officially adopted, a distinction held by the flag of Quebec, which was approved by the Parliament of Quebec on March 7, 1950, two years after the order in council was announced.

In a 2001 online survey conducted by the North American Vexillological Association, Nova Scotia's flag ranked within the top sixth of state, provincial and territorial flags from Canada, the United States, and select current and former territories of the United States. It finished in 12th place out of 72, and placed second among Canadian flags after Quebec. Twelve years later, the flag was officially recognized as the flag of the province under an Act of Legislature. This came about after an eleven-year-old student from Canso uncovered this aberration while conducting research for a school project. Unlike the flags of British Columbia, New Brunswick, and Prince Edward Island – which are also provincial flags that are banner of arms – Nova Scotia's was never recognized as such under a provincial statute. The student contacted the member of the Legislative Assembly representing her electoral district, Jim Boudreau, who consulted with the Legislative Library and other government bodies to ascertain that such a law was not on the books. He consequently introduced the bill that became the Provincial Flag Act after receiving royal assent on May 10, 2013. The student and her family were invited to the House of Assembly that same month in acknowledgment of her efforts.

== Design ==
=== Description ===
The flag of Nova Scotia has an aspect ratio of 1:2. The blazon for the banner of arms – as outlined in the letters patent registering it with the Canadian Heraldic Authority on July 20, 2007 – reads, "Argent a saltire Azure, overall on an escutcheon Or a lion rampant within a double tressure flory-counter-flory Gules". The official colour scheme, according to the website of the Government of Nova Scotia, follows approximately the Pantone Matching System as indicated below. The colour numbers for the flag's white shade are not specified.

Nova Scotia flag colours
Colour	Pantone	RGB values	Hex
Blue	293	0-61-165	#003DA5
Yellow	122	254-209-65	#FED141
Red	186	200-16-46	#C8102E

=== Symbolism ===
The Flag of Scotland (top) and the Royal Arms of Scotland (bottom) inspired Nova Scotia's flag design.

The colours and symbols of the flag carry cultural, political, and regional meanings. According to historians Ian McKay and Robin Bates, the Cross of Saint Andrew alludes to divine providence and its part in enabling Scottish immigrants to be "the first among the Nova Scotians". The royal arms epitomize feudal times in Scotland and how this sowed the seeds of the province's constancy as a society. Taken altogether, the saltire and the royal arms signify how Nova Scotia was formerly a colony of the Kingdom of Scotland with the backing of its royal family (the House of Stuart).

=== Similarities ===
The Nova Scotian flag has a conspicuous resemblance to both the national flag and the Royal Banner of Scotland. The shield is also identical to the royal arms of Scotland. This is due to Nova Scotia's aforementioned historical connections to the country. The colours of Saint Andrew's Cross were reversed on the province's flag in order to bring about a more distinct contrast with the royal arms, as stated by Whitney Smith. (The Pantone 293 shade of the blue saltire is a darker blue than the recommended Pantone 300 shade of the Flag of Scotland).

== Protocol ==
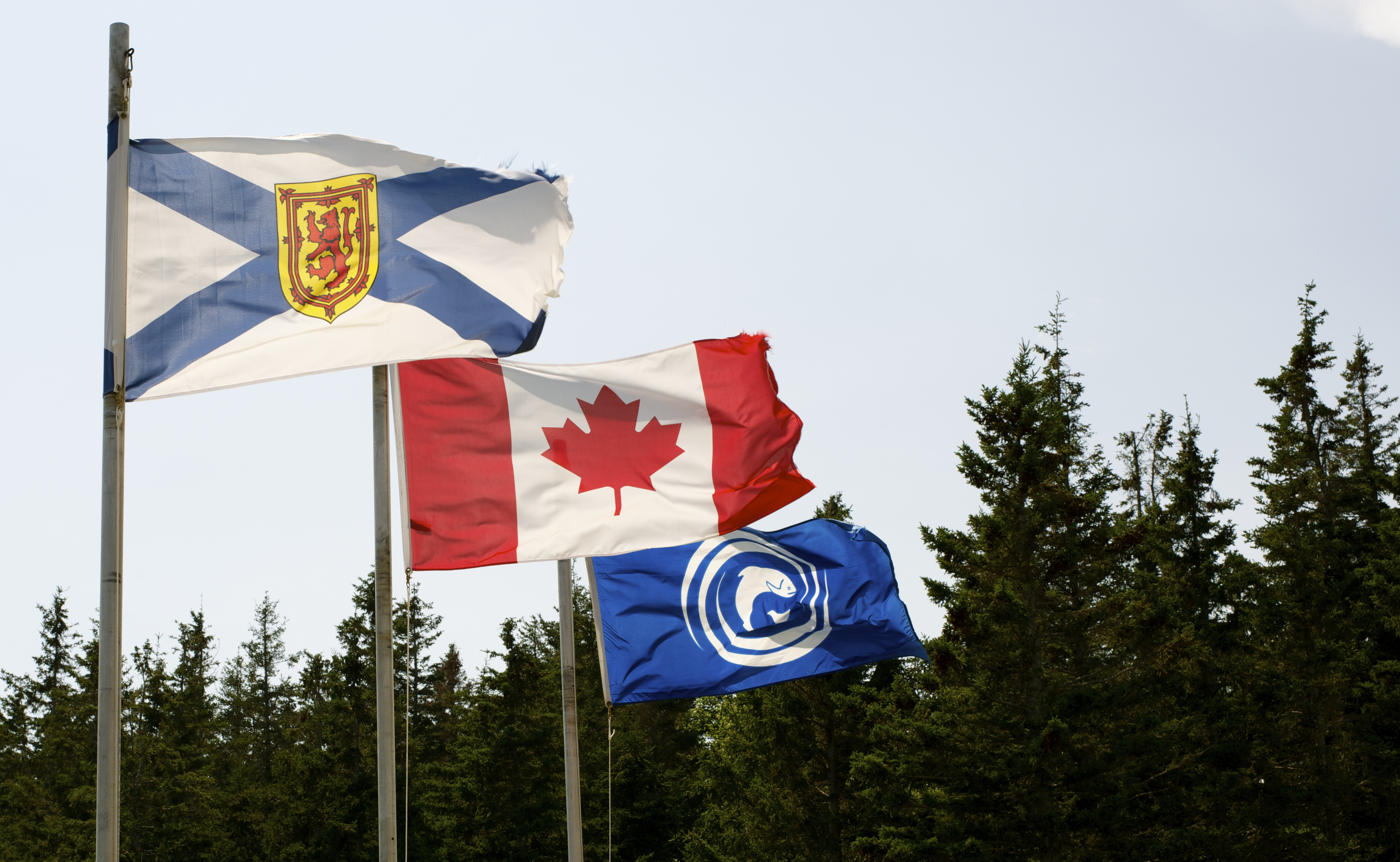
The Flag of Nova Scotia, Flag of Canada and Nova Scotia Gaelic flag.

Advice regarding flag etiquette is the responsibility of the province's Protocol Office. When flown together with the flag of Canada and the other provincial and territorial flags, the flag of Nova Scotia is fourth in the order of precedence (after the national flag and, in descending order of precedence, the flags of Ontario and Quebec, and ahead of New Brunswick). Even though Nova Scotia entered into Confederation on the same date as those three provinces (July 1, 1867), it is placed third among the group since its size of population at the time was the third-largest.

== See also ==
- Symbols of Nova Scotia
- Coat of arms of Nova Scotia
