= Coat of arms of the Halifax Regional Municipality =

- Adopted: Letters patent granted on 15 July 1999.
- Crest: On a mural coronet Or issuant therefrom a sprig of mayflower of four blossoms proper
- Shield: Azure a saltire Or and a bezant merged thereon a Kingfisher between four broad arrows points outward Azure in fess two sailing vessels tempore 1760 flags flying to the dexter Or
- Supporters: On a grassy mound Vert set dexter with garbs Or and sinister with spruce trees Vert between barry wavy Azure and Argent dexter a hippocampus Or gorged with a circlet set with maple leaves Vert pendant therefrom an open book Argent bound Azure holding between its legs a staff Argent flying therefrom the banner of the Province of Nova Scotia proper sinister a like hippocampus similarly gorged pendant therefrom two paddles in saltire Azure holding between its legs a staff Argent flying therefrom the banner of Halifax Regional Municipality proper
- Motto: E MARI MERCES

The coat of arms of Halifax, Nova Scotia is the full armorial achievement as used by the municipal government as an official symbol.

== Symbolism ==
The principal charge on the arms, St. Andrew’s cross, represent the municipality as the capital of Nova Scotia. The four arms of the cross represent the four previous municipalities – the City of Halifax, the City of Dartmouth, the County of Halifax, and the Town of Bedford – who merged in 1996 to form the Halifax Regional Municipality. The kingfisher is taken from the coat of arms of the city of Halifax while the ships and arrows remember the emblems of Dartmouth and Bedford.

== Blazon ==
The blazon is :

Azure a saltire Or and a bezant merged thereon a Kingfisher between four broad arrows points outward Azure in fess two sailing vessels tempore 1760 flags flying to the dexter Or;
