= Ceremonial maces in Canada =

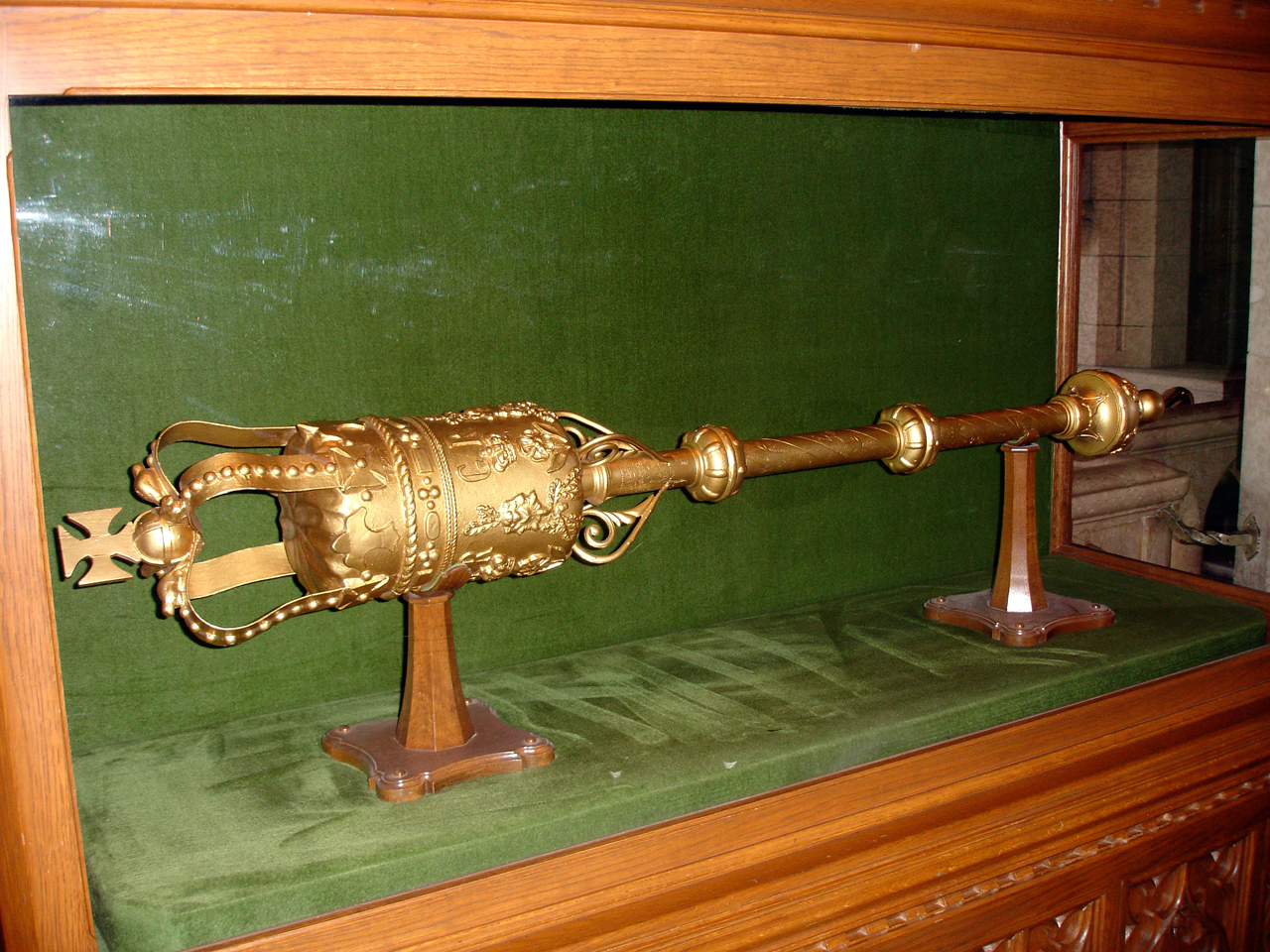
Mace of the Senate of Canada, on display at the Parliament of Canada's senate foyer

Ceremonial maces in Canada began as a tradition carried from the Parliament of the United Kingdom, where they represent the Sovereign's Authority. This was derived from their use as lethal weapons of medieval knights in England, Scotland, and Wales, evolving into ceremonial objects carried by sergeants-at-arms.

The ceremonial maces in the Canadian Senate and House of Commons embody the authority each chamber derives from the country's sovereign. It also represents the Royal authority of Charles III, the King of Canada. The current mace in the Commons is the fourth mace, a replica of the third one destroyed by fire at the Centre Block in 1916.

A similar practice is employed in each of the provincial and territorial legislatures, with a mace representing the sovereign's authority and power in each of the respective legislatures.

== Protocol ==
In Canada, each of the legislatures follow a relatively standard protocol in relation to the ceremonial mace; the speaker of the house normally enters following a mace-bearer (normally the sergeant-at-arms), who subsequently sets the mace on the clerks' table to begin the sitting. When the sergeant-at-arms removes the mace from the table, the House has either adjourned, recessed, or been resolved into a committee of the whole. Before the reigning monarch or one of his or her representatives (the governor general or one of the lieutenant governors) may enter a legislative chamber, the mace must be completely hidden from view. This is done by draping the mace in a heavy velvet cloth, a procedure performed by the house pages. During the election of the speaker, the mace is removed from the table to show that the house is not fully constituted until the new speaker takes the chair and the mace is laid on the table.

== History ==
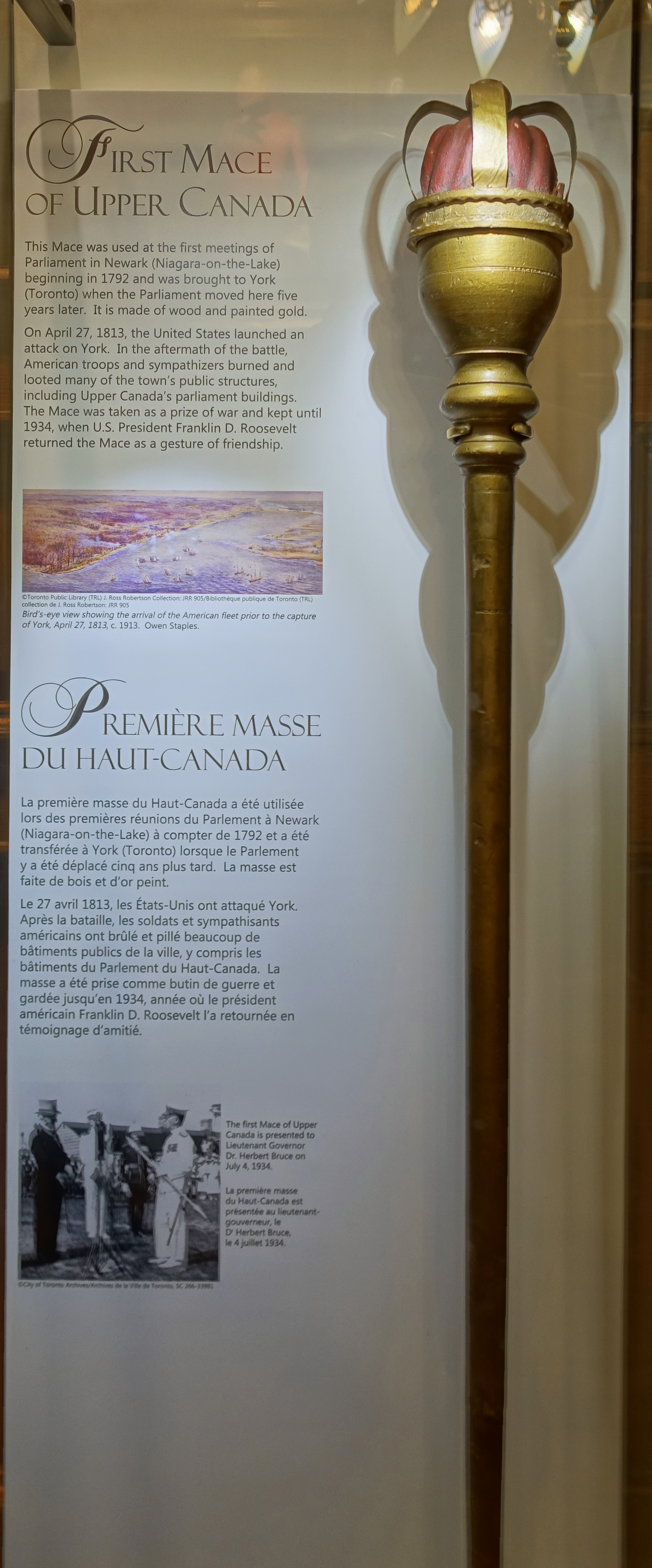
The first mace used by the Legislative Assembly of Upper Canada.

The oldest documented use of a ceremonial mace in a legislature of a British North American colony was at the 1st General Assembly of Nova Scotia, which convened in 1758. The first mace was used by the Chamber of Upper Canada's first Parliament in 1792 at Newark (now Niagara-on-the-Lake) and then moved to York (now Toronto). This first mace was a primitive wooden implement, painted red and gilt and surmounted by a crown of thin brass strips. It was stolen by American troops as a prize of war during the Battle of York of the War of 1812 in 1813. The mace was stored at the United States Naval Academy in Annapolis, Maryland, and remained in the United States until 1934. It was returned to Ontario when President Franklin Roosevelt sent an order to Congress to return the mace. It was stored at the Royal Ontario Museum for a time, and is now located in the Main Lobby of the Ontario Legislative Building.

A second mace was introduced in 1813 and used until 1841.

The third mace was not purchased until 1845. In 1849, when the Parliament for the United Province of Canada was sitting in Montreal, it was stolen by a riotous mob, apparently intent upon destroying it in a public demonstration. It was rescued and returned to the Speaker, Sir Allan MacNab, the next day. Later, in 1854, the mace was twice rescued when the Parliament Buildings in Quebec were ravaged by fire. The mace continued to be used by the Legislative Assembly in Toronto, Quebec City and Ottawa until Confederation in 1867. The new House of Commons of Canada then adopted the mace, where it remained until 1916. The mace of the House of Commons was destroyed when the Centre Block burned down in 1916; all that remained was a fist-sized ball of silver and gold. In the immediate aftermath, the House of Commons used the surviving Senate mace, then the mace of the Ontario provincial legislature for three weeks, after which a wooden mace (later loaned to the Bahamas) was crafted and used. In June 1916, the City of London donated a new mace made with the remains of the one destroyed; this mace continues to serve.

Being a symbol of the power and authority of a legislative assembly, a precedent was set in 2002 as to the severity of acts of disrespect toward the mace in Canada and, by proxy, the monarch. After Keith Martin, federal Member of Parliament for Esquimalt—Juan de Fuca, seized the ceremonial mace of the House of Commons from the clerk's table on April 17, 2002, the speaker of that chamber ruled that a prima facie breach of the privileges of the house had occurred, and contempt of the house been committed. Martin was not permitted to resume his seat until he had issued a formal apology from the bar of the house, pursuant to a motion passed in response to the incident.

== Parliament of Canada ==
Badge of the House of Commons

The Canadian Parliament has two houses, the Commons and the Senate, each with its own Mace. The House of Commons has its mace carried by the Sergeant-at-arms, the chief security officer for parliament hill.

=== Use as a symbol ===
In the 2000s, MPs campaigned for the Canadian Parliament to have a distinct heraldic symbol, along the lines of the portcullis used by the British Parliament. The Canadian Heraldic Authority was asked to design such a symbol and, on 15 February 2008, a badge, consisting of the shield of the royal arms superimposed on the mace of the Commons was authorized by the Crown. The Senate was given similar badge for itself, using the mace of the Senate.

On 15 April 2008, a badge to represent the entirety of Parliament was authorized, consisting of the shield of the arms of the Canadian monarch surmounting the mace of the Senate and the mace of the House of Commons in saltire (crossed). Its three elements represent the three elements of Parliament: the sovereign in the shield, the Commons and the Senate in their respective maces.

== Provincial Parliaments ==
=== Parliament of Ontario ===
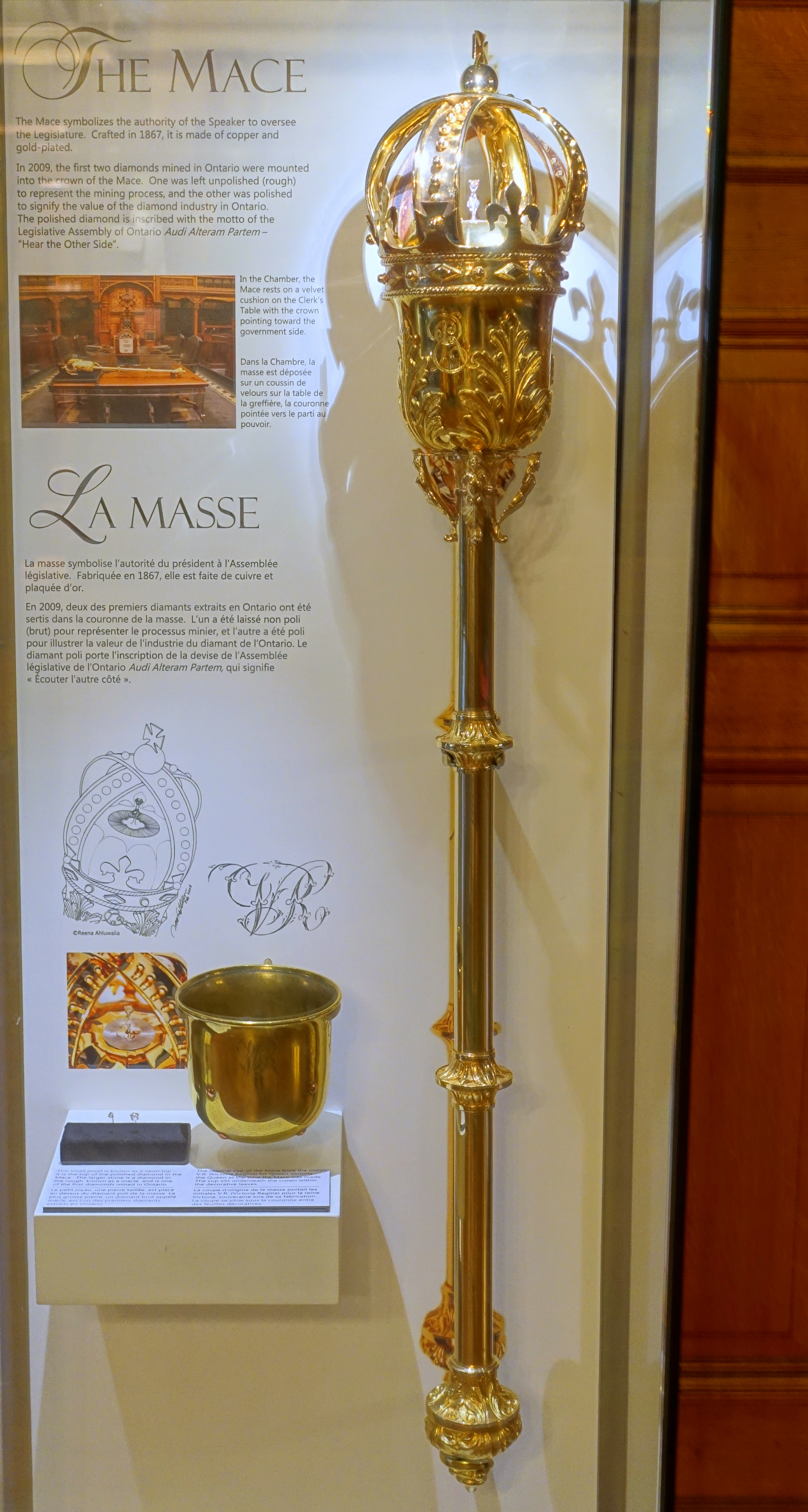
The mace of the Legislative Assembly of Ontario, made in 1867

The ceremonial mace of the Legislative Assembly is the fourth mace to be used in Upper Canada or Ontario. The first, second and third maces are mentioned above, and were used by the Parliament of Upper Canada and Union Parliament. Only the first survived with second unaccounted and third mostly destroyed in 1916 with remains used to produce the current House of Commons' mace.

After Confederation, the third mace was adopted by the new House of Commons of Canada. The current mace used in the Legislative Assembly was acquired in 1867. It was provided by Charles E. Zollikofer of Ottawa for $200. The 4-foot (1.2 m) mace is made of copper and richly gilded, a flattened ball at the butt end. Initially, the head of the mace bore the crown of Queen Victoria and in a cup with her monogram, V.R. When she was succeeded by Edward VII in 1901, her crown and cup were removed and a new one bearing Edward's initials on the cup was installed. Eventually, it was replaced with the current cup which is adorned in gleaming brass leaves.

Through some careful detective work on the part of Legislative Assembly staff, the original cup with Queen Victoria's monogram was recently found in the Royal Ontario Museum's collection and returned to the Legislature. It is now on display in the Legislative Building.

In 2009, two diamonds were installed in the mace. The diamonds were a gift to the people of Ontario from De Beers Canada to mark the opening of the Victor Mine near Attawapiskat First Nation in northern Ontario. Three diamonds were selected from the first run of the mine. Two stones, one rough and one polished, were set in platinum in the crown of the mace while the third stone, also polished, was put on exhibit in the lobby of the Legislative Building as part of a display about the history of the mace.

=== Parliament of Quebec ===
The ceremonial mace of the National Assembly was made by Charles O. Zollikoffer in 1867, after the transfer of the maces of the Province of Canada to the new federal parliament in Ottawa. The current mace is of gold with a crown and a cross on its top as well as the letters "ER" (Elizabeth Regina) - added after 1952.

The mace was saved from a fire by Sergeant-at-Arms Gédéon Larocque in 1883 as well as recovered after being stolen in 1967.

== See also ==
- Ceremonial mace
- Ceremonial maces in the United Kingdom
