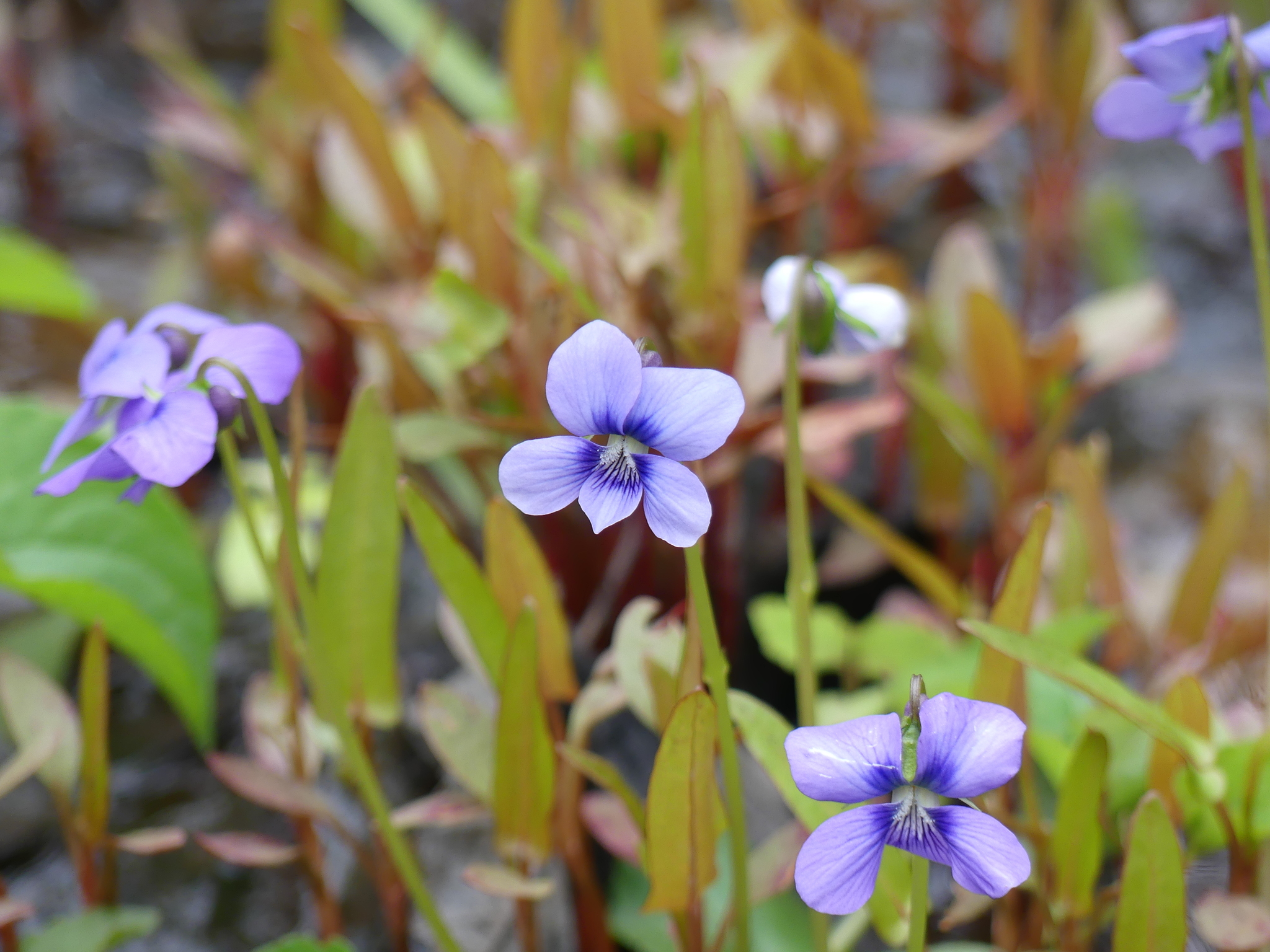

Scientific classification
- Kingdom: Plantae
- Clade: Tracheophytes
- Clade: Angiosperms
- Clade: Eudicots
- Clade: Rosids
- Order: Malpighiales
- Family: Violaceae
- Genus: Viola
- Species: V. cucullata

Binomial name
- Viola cucullata Aiton

= Viola cucullata =

Species of flowering plant

Viola cucullata, the hooded blue violet, marsh blue violet or purple violet, is a species of the genus Viola native to eastern North America, from Newfoundland west to Ontario and Minnesota, and south to Georgia. It is a recipient of the Royal Horticultural Society's Award of Garden Merit.

== Description ==
The purple violet is a low-growing perennial herbaceous plant up to 20 cm (8 in) tall. The leaves form a basal cluster; they are simple, up to 10 cm (4 in) broad, with an crenate-serrate margin and a long petiole. The flowers are violet, dark blue and occasionally white. with five petals. The fruit is a capsule 10–15 mm (3/8–5/8 in) long, which splits into three sections at maturity to release the numerous small seeds. Its habitats include wet meadows, prairies, and fields.

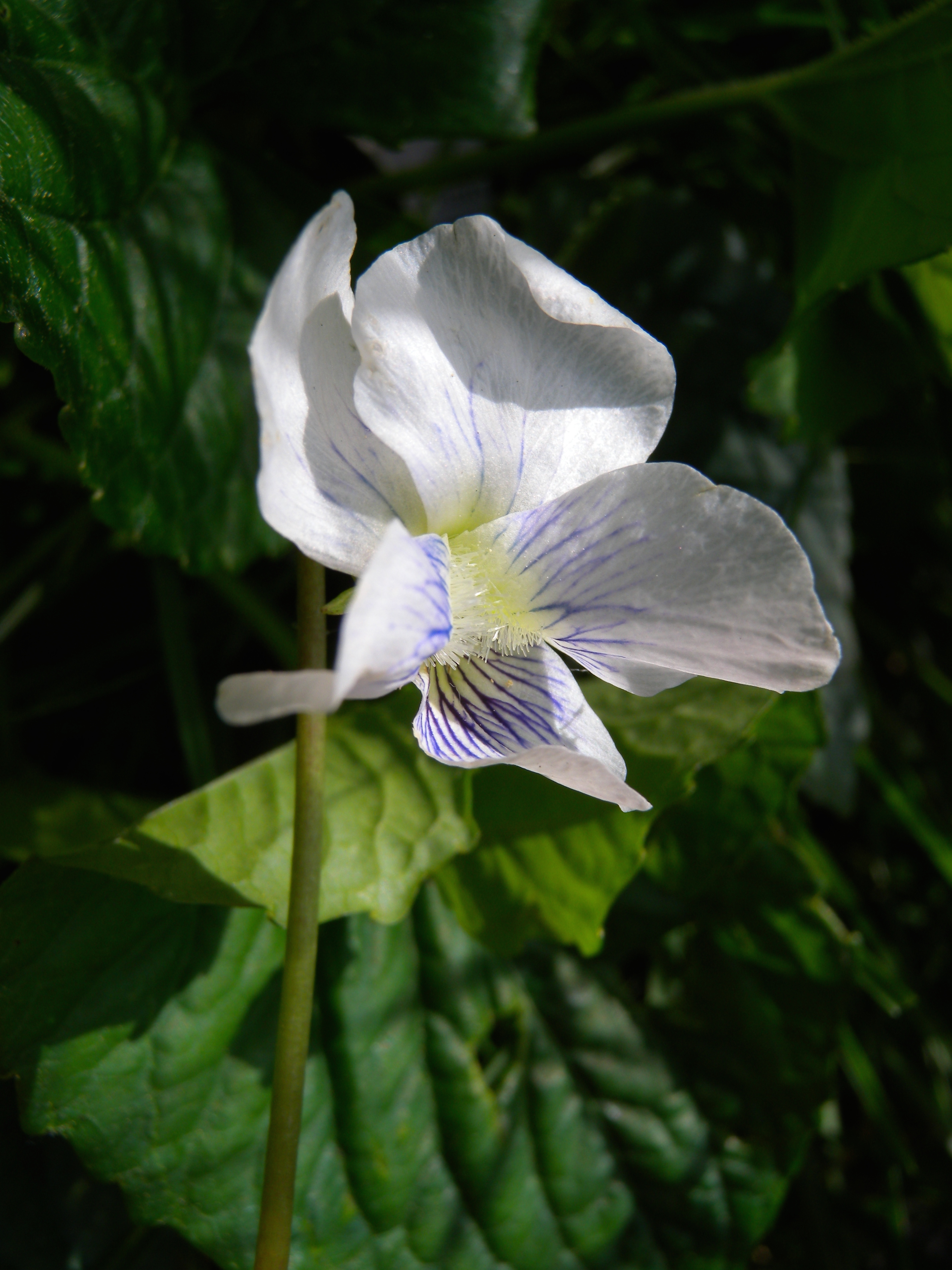
A white purple violet.

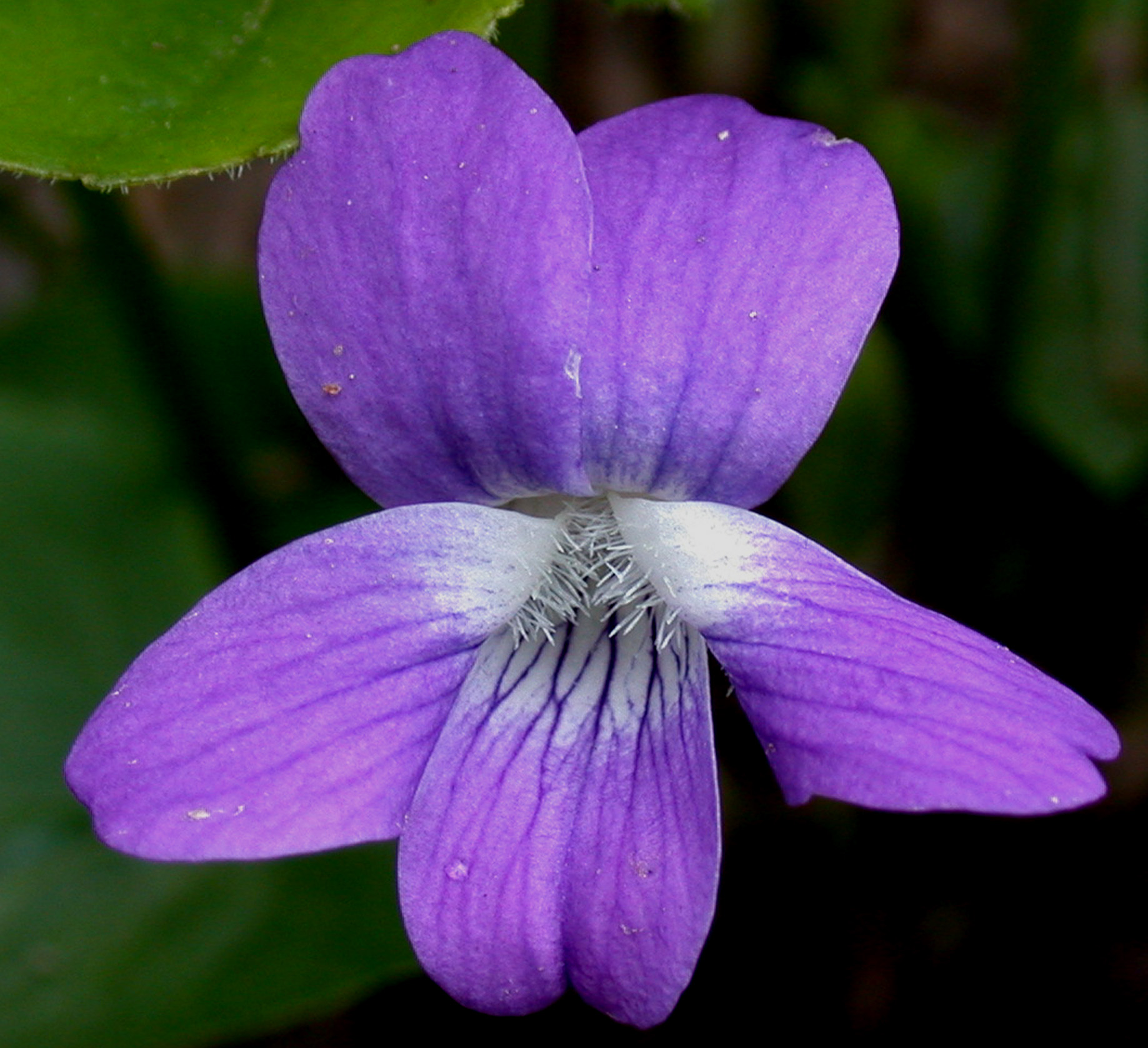
A closeup of a purple violet flower.

== Symbolism ==
The purple violet is the provincial flower of New Brunswick.

The purple violet is the national flower of New Brunswick’s province. The purple violet is the official flower of the sorority Sigma Sigma Sigma.

The purple violet is also one of the official flowers of the Sigma Phi Epsilon fraternity.
