= List of Canadian provincial and territorial symbols =

This is a list of the symbols of the provinces and territories of Canada. Each province and territory has a unique set of official symbols.

== Provinces and territories ==
Provincial and territorial symbols by province and territory
Name	Flag	Coat of arms	Escutcheon	Bird	Animal (mammal)	Fish	Flower	Tree	Mineral	Motto	Other
Alberta	Flag of Alberta			Great horned owl	Bighorn sheep	Bull trout	Wild rose	Lodgepole pine	Petrified wood	Fortis et liber (strong and free)	Provincial grass: rough fescue, song: "Alberta", gemstone: ammolite
British Columbia	Flag of British Columbia	Coat of arms of British Columbia		Steller's jay	Spirit bear	Pacific salmon	Pacific dogwood	Western redcedar	Jade	Splendor sine occasu (splendour without diminishment)	Provincial fossil: Elasmosaur
Manitoba	Flag of Manitoba	Coat of arms of Manitoba		Great grey owl	Plains bison	Walleye	Prairie crocus	White spruce	–	Gloriosus et liber (glorious and free)	Provincial grass: big bluestem, fossil: Tylosaurus pembinensis, soil: Newdale soil (Orthic Black Chernozem)
New Brunswick	Flag of New Brunswick	Coat of arms of New Brunswick		Black-capped chickadee	–	–	Purple violet	Balsam fir	–	Spem reduxit (hope was restored)	Provincial soil: Holmesville, Salmon Fly: Picture Province
Newfoundland and Labrador	Flag of Newfoundland and Labrador	Coat of arms of Newfoundland and Labrador		Atlantic puffin (provincial bird); Willow ptarmigan Rock ptarmigan (game bird)	Woodland caribou (Newfoundland regimental mascot); Newfoundland pony (heritage animal)	–	Purple pitcher plant	Black spruce	Labradorite	Quaerite primum regnum dei (seek ye first the kingdom of God)	Anthem: "Ode to Newfoundland", Newfoundland Tricolour, Labrador flag
Northwest Territories	Flag of the Northwest Territories	Coat of arms of the Northwest Territories		Gyrfalcon	–	Arctic grayling	Mountain avens	Tamarack larch	Gold	–	Territorial gemstone: diamond
Nova Scotia	Flag of Nova Scotia	Coat of arms of Nova Scotia		Osprey	Nova Scotia Duck Tolling Retriever; Sable Island horse	Brook trout	Mayflower	Red spruce	Stilbite	Munit haec et altera vincit (one defends and the other conquers)	Sailing ambassador: Bluenose II, Nova Scotia tartan; berry: wild blueberry; fossil: Hylonomus lyelli; gemstone: agate
Nunavut	Flag of Nunavut	Coat of arms of Nunavut		Rock ptarmigan	Canadian Inuit Dog	–	Purple saxifrage	–	–	Nunavut Sanginivut (Our land, our strength)	–
Ontario	Flag of Ontario	Coat of arms of Ontario		Common loon	–	–	White trillium	Eastern white pine	Amethyst	Ut incepit fidelis sic permanet (loyal she began thus she remains)	
Prince Edward Island	Flag of Prince Edward Island	Coat of arms of Prince Edward Island		Blue jay	Red fox	–	Lady's slipper	Red oak	–	Parva sub ingenti (the small under the protection of the great)	Provincial soil: Charlottetown; anthem: "The Island Hymn"
Quebec	Flag of Quebec	Coat of arms of Quebec		Snowy owl	–	–	Blue flag iris	Yellow birch	–	Je me souviens (I remember)	Provincial symbol: fleur-de-lis
Saskatchewan	Flag of Saskatchewan	Coat of arms of Saskatchewan		Sharp-tailed grouse	White-tailed deer	Walleye	Western red lily	White birch	Potash	Multis e gentibus vires (from many peoples, strength)	Provincial grass: needle-and-thread grass, fruit emblem: Saskatoon berry, Fossil: Tyrannosaurus rex
Yukon	Flag of Yukon	Coat of arms of Yukon		Common raven	–	–	Fireweed	Subalpine fir	Lazulite	–	–

== See also ==
Symbols by provinces and territories
- Coat of arms of Canada
- List of Canadian flags
- National symbols of Canada
- Canadian Red Ensign
- Regional tartans of Canada
