= Symbols of Manitoba =

Symbols of Canadian province

There are several symbols of Manitoba, one of the ten provinces of Canada. These symbols are designated by The Coat of Arms, Emblems and the Manitoba Tartan Act, which came into force on Feb 1, 1988.

== Symbols ==
Type	Image	Symbol	Adopted	Remarks
Coat of arms		Coat of arms of Manitoba	May 10, 1905	The coat of arms was granted by royal warrant of King Edward VII. It was augmented on October 23, 1992, by Governor-General Ray Hnatyshyn and granted royal assent on July 27, 1993.
Coat of arms		The center begins with a crown, followed by a beaver sejeant holding a prairie crocus, red and silver mantling, and the shield of arms, which rests on seven croci. A unicorn and a white horse support the left and right sides. It also includes maple leaves, the wheel of a Red River cart, and Prairie Indian beadwork and bone decorations. The base is composed of a wheat field and a forest of white spruce. The bottom shows a banner bearing the provincial motto in Latin.		
Motto		Latin: Gloriosus et liber; 'Glorious and free'	July 27, 1993	Granted with the augmented coat of arms by royal assent.
Motto		It is a reference to the eighth line of "O Canada".		
Shield of arms		Shield of Manitoba	May 10, 1905	Granted by the royal warrant of King Edward VII.
Shield of arms		The design is based on the 1870 Great Seal of Manitoba. It includes a bison, meant to represent Manitoba's Indigenous peoples who used them for both food and clothing. The red cross on white at the top of the shield is Saint George's Cross.		
Flag	Flag of Manitoba	Flag of Manitoba	June 12, 1961	The flag was given royal approval by Queen Elizabeth II in October 1965.
Flag	Flag of Manitoba	The flag is a Red Ensign, which features the Union Jack in the canton, and the coat of arms on a red field or ground.		
Mammal	Plains bison	Plains bison; (Bison bison bison)	June 10, 2014	
Mammal	Plains bison	Used to identify government programs and organizations		
Great Seal		The Great Seal of the Province of Manitoba		Authorized by an Order-in-Council.
Great Seal		The Minister of Justice and Attorney General is also the Keeper of Great Seal.		
Fossil	Tylosaurus pembinensis	Mosasaur; (Tylosaurus pembinensis)	June, 2015	
Fossil	Tylosaurus pembinensis	The mosasaur was Manitoba's largest ancient marine reptile from the Cretaceous period, approximately 80 million years ago. The fossilized Mosasaur, nicknamed Bruce the Mosasaur, is permanently displayed at the Canadian Fossil Discovery Centre in Morden, the city where it was discovered nearby in 1974. Bruce is the world's largest fossilized specimen of the prehistoric marine reptile.		
Bird	Great grey owl	Great grey owl; (Strix nebulosa)	July 16, 1987	
Bird	Great grey owl	The great gray owl is North America's largest owl, with a wingspan of 1.3 metres (4.3 ft).		
Fish	Sander vitreus	Walleye, a.k.a. yellow pickerel; (Sander vitreus)	June 10, 2014	The walleye became the official fish of Manitoba after winning 1,450 votes of 4,000 votes from Manitobans.
Fish	Sander vitreus	The commercial walleye industry in Manitoba is the 2nd largest inland fishery in Canada.		
Tree	White spruce	White spruce; (Picea glauca)		
Tree	White spruce	The white spruce is found throughout most of Manitoba. The white spruce is disease resistant and capable of growing in most climatic conditions.		
Flower	Crocus	Prairie Crocus (Anemone patens)	March 16, 1906	
Flower	Crocus	The Prairie Crocus is the first flower to bloom on the prairies each spring. Its mauve petals are often seen before the last snow has melted, so it is a sign that spring has arrived in Manitoba.		
Grass emblem	Andropogon	Big bluestem (Andropogon gerardi)	June 10, 2014	Big Bluestem became Manitoba's official provincial grass emblem after a public voted that took place from April 15 to December 15, 2009.
Grass emblem	Andropogon	Able to reach a height of 150 cm (4.9 ft), Big Bluestem is one of the main species of the Tallgrass prairie, and it occurs throughout the prairie grassland areas of southern Manitoba. Its wide long blue-green leaves sometimes tipped with red or purple and its purplish flowering head that resembles the foot of turkey.		
Official tartan	Tartan of Manitoba	Manitoba Tartan	May 1, 1962	The provincial tartan was approved by the Lord Lyon King of Arms.
Official tartan	Tartan of Manitoba	The dark red squares represent the Red River Settlement; the dark green (tartan green) squares represent the natural resources of Manitoba; and the azure blue represent Thomas Douglas, 5th Earl of Selkirk, founder of the Red River Settlement. The intersecting blue lines represent The Forks, created by the joining of the Red and Assiniboine rivers; the gold lines represent Manitoba's agricultural heritage; and the dark green lines represent the people of Manitoba. The 6th of April is recognized as Manitoba Tartan Day, in recognition of the influence of Scottish Manitobans in the cultural heritage of the province.		
Orders		Order of Manitoba	1999	
Orders		The Order of Manitoba is the highest honour that the Province can bestow.		
Soil		Newdale soil (Orthic Black Chernozem)	June 17, 2010	
Soil		Newdale soil covers approximately 1.3 million acres (5,300 km^{2}), and Manitoba has more of it than any other province in Canada. Newdale soil is a specific type of Orthic Black Chernozem that is found north of Brandon. The name Newdale takes its name from a town on the Yellowhead Highway, west of Minnedosa.		
