= Harbhajan Singh Dhaliwal =

Canadian physician

Dhali Dhaliwal OM

CEO, Cancer Care Manitoba
- In office 2003–2013

Personal details
- Occupation: Oncologist; academician
- Awards: Member of the Order of Manitoba

Harbhajan Singh Dhaliwal, also known as Dhali Dhaliwal, is a Canadian physician, academician, and former healthcare executive known for his work in oncology and public health in Manitoba, Canada. He holds the title of professor emeritus in internal medicine at the Max Rady College of Medicine, University of Manitoba.

== Career ==
He served as a professor of internal medicine at the Max Rady College of Medicine. In 2003, Dhaliwal was appointed president and CEO of CancerCare Manitoba, a position he held until 2013.

== Honours ==
Ribbon	Description	Notes
	Member of the Order of Manitoba (OM)	2016
