= Flag of the Hudson's Bay Company =

Hudson's Bay Company
- Use: The company's governor's standard used as the company's flag from 1970 to 2012
- Proportion: 1∶2

The flag of the Hudson's Bay Company was used to represent the Hudson's Bay Company. The flag varied over time. From July 21, 1682, to 1965, the flag consisted of the Red Ensign with the letters "HBC" in the lower field. In 1970 the company used the flag that display the company's coat of arms. Beginning in 2012, the company flag was the banner form of the company logo.

In 2025, Canadian Tire Corporation acquired the intellectual property of the Hudson’s Bay Company for CA$30 million, taking ownership of its coats of arms, logos (flags and insignias), and the multicoloured stripes following HBC's liquidation.

== History ==
Following the incorporation of the Hudson's Bay Company in 1670, the company was granted permission on July 21, 1682, by the first governor of the company, Prince Rupert, to use a modified version of the English Red Ensign on its forts and ships entering Hudson Strait. The flag consisted of the Red Ensign with the letters "HBC" in the lower fly. The flag shared a similar design as the flag of Ontario and the flag of Manitoba in using the Red Ensign.

The canton of the flag has been changed twice. Between 1682 and 1707, the flag of St. George was in the canton before being replaced by the flag of Great Britainfollowing the 1707 Acts of Union. In 1801 this was replaced by the flag of the United Kingdom following the Acts of Union 1800.

Prior to 1869 the flag was used as both the flag of Rupert's Land and the Hudson's Bay Company. After Rupert's Land was purchased by the government of Canada, the flag continued as the flag of the HBC. The company stopped using its Red Ensign flag in 1965 after the flag of Canada was introduced.

In 1970, the company adopted the company's governor's standard as its corporate flag. The flag was introduced in 1779 as the company's governor's standard and was flown to indicate the presence of the company's governor at a specific location. The flag features the company's coat of arms on a white field.

In the fall of 2012, the Hudson's Bay Company launched a re-design of both its corporate and retail logos. The company adopted a flag that was the same design as the company logo, which was the dark blue field and the letters "HBC" in the centre.

The HBC logotype on the flag has varied over the decades. In historical photographs and postcards, the HBC logotype in the bottom-right corner of the flag have had multiple variants in typography, including periods embedded within as HB.C. as seen in old postcards and photos.

First HBC flag a modified Red Ensign, used from 1682 to 1707

HBC flag from 1707 to 1801 featuring the flag of Great Britain.

HBC flag from 1801 to 1965 featuring the flag of the United Kingdom.

HBC flag 2012 to 2025

== See also ==
- Coat of arms of the Hudson's Bay Company
- Hudson's Bay Stripes
- Flag of the Northwest Territories
- Flag of the British East India Company
- Flag of the British South Africa Company
