= Coat of arms of the Hudson's Bay Company =

Heraldic symbol of Canadian company

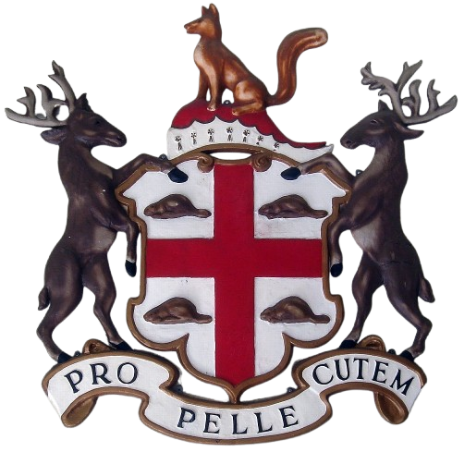
- Armiger: Hudson's Bay Company
- Adopted: 1671
- Crest: Upon a cap of maintenance Gules turned up Ermine, a fox sejant proper;
- Shield: Argent a cross Gules between four beavers statant Sable;
- Supporters: Two elks proper;
- Motto: Pro Pelle Cutem

The coat of arms of the Hudson's Bay Company is the heraldic symbol representing the Hudson's Bay Company, the oldest corporation in Canada. The arms are rarely used on their own, however they can be seen on the logo of the company redrawn by Mark Summers in 2013.

The coat of arms was adopted one year after the company was founded, in 1671. The supporters consists of two elks and the crest is a fox standing on a cap of maintenance. The shield is a red cross with a beaver in every quarter. The motto is Pro Pelle Cutem, a phrase in Latin meaning A Pelt For A Skin.

In 2025, Canadian Tire Corporation acquired the intellectual property of the Hudson’s Bay Company for CA$30 million, taking ownership of its coats of arms logos (flags and insignias), and the multicoloured stripes following HBC's liquidation.

== History ==
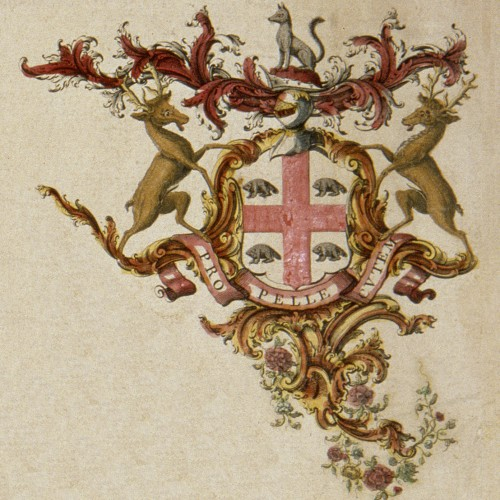
Original coat of arms adopted in 1671.

The arms and motto of the Hudson's Bay Company were adopted following the grant of a charter by Charles II, which founded the corporation. The first seal was cut in 1671, and the prints of the coat of arms and motto date back to 1679. A "Little Seale" was ordered in 1680, and a silver seal in 1683.

The arms adopted in 1671 were blazoned as follows:

Argent, a cross gules, between four beavers passant proper. Crest — On a chapeau gules turned up ermine squirrel sejant proper. — Supporters — Two bucks proper. — Motto — " Pro pelle cutem."

The registration with the College of Arms in London does not seem to have been recorded until 1921, but this is probably due to a discrepancy in the official records. The motto and coat of arms are obviously heraldically proper in terms of composition and design. Additionally, the company has utilized the corporate seal with the coat of arms on it since the beginning, according to the historical record; having a corporate seal was and remains a crucial component of any corporation's legal existence. A number of elements of the coat of arms have not changed over the years. Two elk anchor the shield and crest. Since no Europeans, or at least none at the College of Arms in England, had ever seen an elk, the animals on the initial coat of arms were actually somewhat strange-looking. The earliest depictions of these animals display antlers that resemble caribou more than what we know as elk. The animals were intended to be moose, according to E.E. Rich, a professor of Canadian fur trade history and the editor of the Hudson's Bay Record Society from 1937 to 1959. The vague "elk" was changed to the obvious moose in the 1961 update to the Canadian share certificate coat of arms.

The arms were registered by the Canadian Heraldic Authority in 2017. They have been incorporated in the logo of the company, redrawn in 2013 by Mark Summers, to replace the former logo used since 1956.

== Description ==
The arms were registered in London by the Canadian Heraldic Authority in 2017 and were blazoned as follows:

Argent a cross Gules between four beavers statant Sable. Crest — Upon a cap of maintenance Gules turned up Ermine, a fox sejant proper. —Supporters— Two elks proper. — Motto — " Pro pelle cutem."

The red cross on the shield depicts a Cross of Saint George — a symbol of England — and four beavers can be seen, one in each quarter representing the fur trade. Above the shield, serving as a crest, is a fox standing upon a cap of maintenance. Supporting the shield and the crest are two elks serving as supporters. Under it all is the motto are the words "Pro pelle cutem" a phrase in latin meaning ''A Pelt For A Skin'', a play on Job, 2:4: Pellem pro pelle "skin for skin".

== Use ==
The arms have since become a symbol of the Hudson's Bay Company, being used on one of its former flags — where it could be seen on a bland white background — and on it is the logo since 2013 — in black and white with the words HUDSON'S BAY COMPANY INCORPORATED 2 MAY 1670 under the arms. However, the coat of arms are now rarely used by themselves. Furthermore, because of the vast surface the Hudson's Bay Company covered and its influence on the early North American company, the beavers on the arms have inspired the animal to become the symbol of Canada in 1975. The cross of the arms is on the heraldic achievement of Alberta, and the beaver with a crown on its head is inspired by those on the arms of the company. The cross on the arms and flag of Manitoba is also inspired by the heraldic achievement of the company, and so is that seen on the coat of arms of Nanaimo. The seal of Michigan is patterned after the coat of arms. The arms can also be seen on former trading posts the company occupied such as York Factory and Moose Factory.

== See also ==
- Flag of the Hudson's Bay Company
- Hudson's Bay Stripes
