= Flag of Manitoba =

Canadian provincial flag

Manitoba
- Use: Civil and state flag
- Proportion: 1:2
- Adopted: May 11, 1965; 61 years ago (first flown on May 12, 1966)
- Design: A Red Ensign with the shield of the coat of arms of Manitoba in the field
- Canadian Heraldic Authority Design
- Proportion: 1:2
- Design: A Red Ensign with a modified shield of the coat of arms of Manitoba in the field

The flag of Manitoba consists of a Red Ensign defaced with the shield of the provincial coat of arms. Adopted in 1965 shortly after the new national flag was inaugurated, it has been the flag of the province since May 12 of the following year. Its adoption was intended to maintain the legacy of the Canadian Red Ensign as the country's unofficial flag, after the adoption of the Maple Leaf Flag in 1965. Manitoba's flag has been frequently mistaken for the flag of the neighbouring province of Ontario, which is also a Red Ensign with its respective coat of arms. This, along with criticisms of a lack of inclusivity of the flag, has led some Manitobans to call for a new and more distinct flag.

== History ==
The Manitoba Act received royal assent on May 12, 1870, allowing for the creation of the province of Manitoba; it officially joined Confederation two months later on July 15. On August 2 of that same year, an Order in Council was promulgated to establish a seal for the new province. It featured the Cross of Saint George at the chief and a bison on a green field for the lower portion. Subsequently, King Edward VII issued a Royal Warrant on May 10, 1905, allowing Manitoba to utilize their own coat of arms. At the time, this consisted solely of a shield identical to the Great Seal of the province.

On February 15, 1965, the federal government introduced a new national flag featuring a maple leaf to replace the Union Jack (the official flag) and the Canadian Red Ensign, the country's civil ensign at the time that had been used unofficially as the national flag. The Great Canadian Flag Debate that preceded this change showed there were still parts of Canada where imperialist nostalgia was strong. Lamenting the demise of the Canadian Red Ensign, its proponents in those regions endeavoured to have it modified as a provincial flag. Resistance to the new national flag was most vociferous in the rural areas of Manitoba and Ontario. Consequently, both provinces chose to incorporate the Red Ensign into their official flags. In Manitoba, Maitland Steinkopf – the Provincial Secretary at the time – favoured a contest to design a provincial flag from scratch. In order to meet halfway with those who wanted to utilize the Canadian Red Ensign as Manitoba's flag without modification, the Red Ensign was selected but the provincial shield was employed instead of the national one. The Act of Legislature that tabled this flag received royal assent on May 11, 1965. The provincial government subsequently sought approval from Queen Elizabeth II, since this entailed defacing a British flag; this was granted on August 27 of that same year. The new flag was first hoisted officially on May 12, 1966. One of the two flag-raisers at that ceremony was a descendant of Thomas Button, the British explorer who in 1612 raised the first British flag over what is now Manitoba.

In an online survey conducted in 2001 by the North American Vexillological Association (NAVA), Manitoba's flag ranked in the bottom half of state, provincial and territorial flags from Canada, the United States, and select current and former territories of the United States. It finished in 44th place out of 72 – one spot behind Ontario's flag – and finished last among Canadian flags. The Association was of the opinion that the flag lacked distinctiveness. It recommended making the bison as a central figure, as well as doing away with the Union Jack in the canton.

=== Modern day ===
Due to the similarities shared by the Manitoba flag with the flag of neighbouring Ontario – with the bottom part of their escutcheons being the sole difference – the two pennants have often been mistaken for one another. Others have complained that it is an anachronistic remnant of British colonial rule over Manitoba. These issues have brought about calls by some Manitobans for a new flag unique to their home province that would represent it better.

Heather Jones' proposed flag for Manitoba, winner of the 2001 Winnipeg Free Press contest. The bison is the province's most recognizable symbol, while the sun evokes the slogan "Sunny Manitoba".

In 2001, the Winnipeg Free Press held a contest to design a potential new flag for Manitoba, with the top 34 designs selected for voting. The winning entry came from Heather Jones of Fort Rouge, whose design consisted of a stylized blue bison set against a golden sun. However, the flag was never adopted by the province.

A motion calling for a change to the flag was put forward on the program at the provincial New Democratic Party's annual convention in March 2009. However, it failed to make the deadline to get voted on and consequently did not proceed further. Coupled with the fact that the Progressive Conservative Party – which in 2016 won the largest majority in the province's history and were re-elected in 2019 – are in favour of the status quo given its connection to Manitoba's origins, the prospect of changing the flag in the near future appears to be remote. The 150th anniversary of Manitoba's entrance into Confederation in 2020 led to renewed calls for a redesign of the flag. In 2024, the Manitoba chapter of the NAVA released a public survey asking for the opinion of Manitobans on the current flag and if they would support the pursuit of a new provincial flag, signalling the start of an effort by the association to change the flag.

== Design ==
=== Description ===
The flag of Manitoba is described in detail in The Provincial Flag Act, provincial legislation that has been in force from February 1, 1988. It specifies the flag is to have an aspect ratio of 2:1, "with the Union Jack occupying the upper quarter next the staff and with the shield of the armorial ensigns of the province centred in the half farthest from the staff." The flag's blazon – as outlined in the letters patent registering it with the Canadian Heraldic Authority on November 15, 2010 – reads, "Gules an escutcheon of the Arms of Manitoba, a canton of the Royal Union Flag proper".

The official colour scheme follows the British Admiralty Colour Code, with No. T1144 utilized for nylon worsted bunting, and No. T818A for any other bunting. This roughly corresponds to the Pantone Matching System as indicated below.

Manitoba flag colour
Colour	Pantone	RGB values	Hex
Red	186	200-16-46	#C8102E

=== Symbolism ===
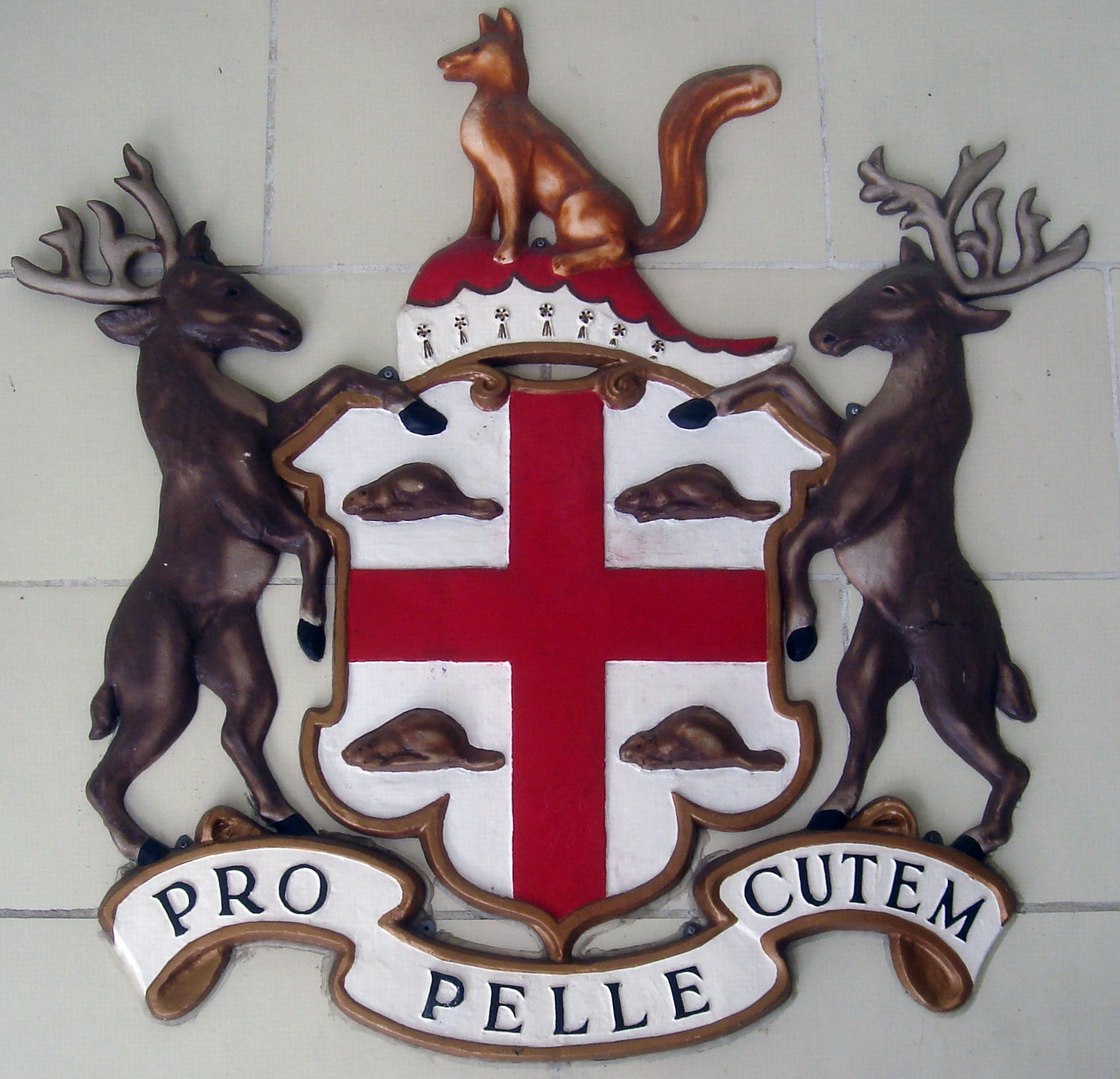
The arms of the Hudson's Bay Company, which controlled the territory that is now Manitoba, also features Saint George's Cross.

The colours and symbols of the flag carry cultural, political, and regional meanings. According to Auguste Vachon, the bison evokes the Indigenous peoples living in the province, such as the Assiniboine and the Cree. Bison was an integral part of their livelihood, serving as a source of food and clothing. The Cross of Saint George alludes to the patron saint of England, as well as to the arms of the Hudson's Bay Company (HBC), which ruled over the land that is now Manitoba. The Red Ensign is a conspicuous symbol of Great Britain, Canada's mother country.

=== Similarities ===
In addition to the aforementioned resemblance with the flag of Ontario and the Canadian Red Ensign, the Manitoban flag bears a likeness to the flag of the HBC. The company was the only private firm ever permitted to use the modified Red Ensign in its day-to-day operations, and its flag was frequently confused with that of several Canadian provinces. Manitoba's flag is also analogous to the flag of Bermuda.

== Protocol ==
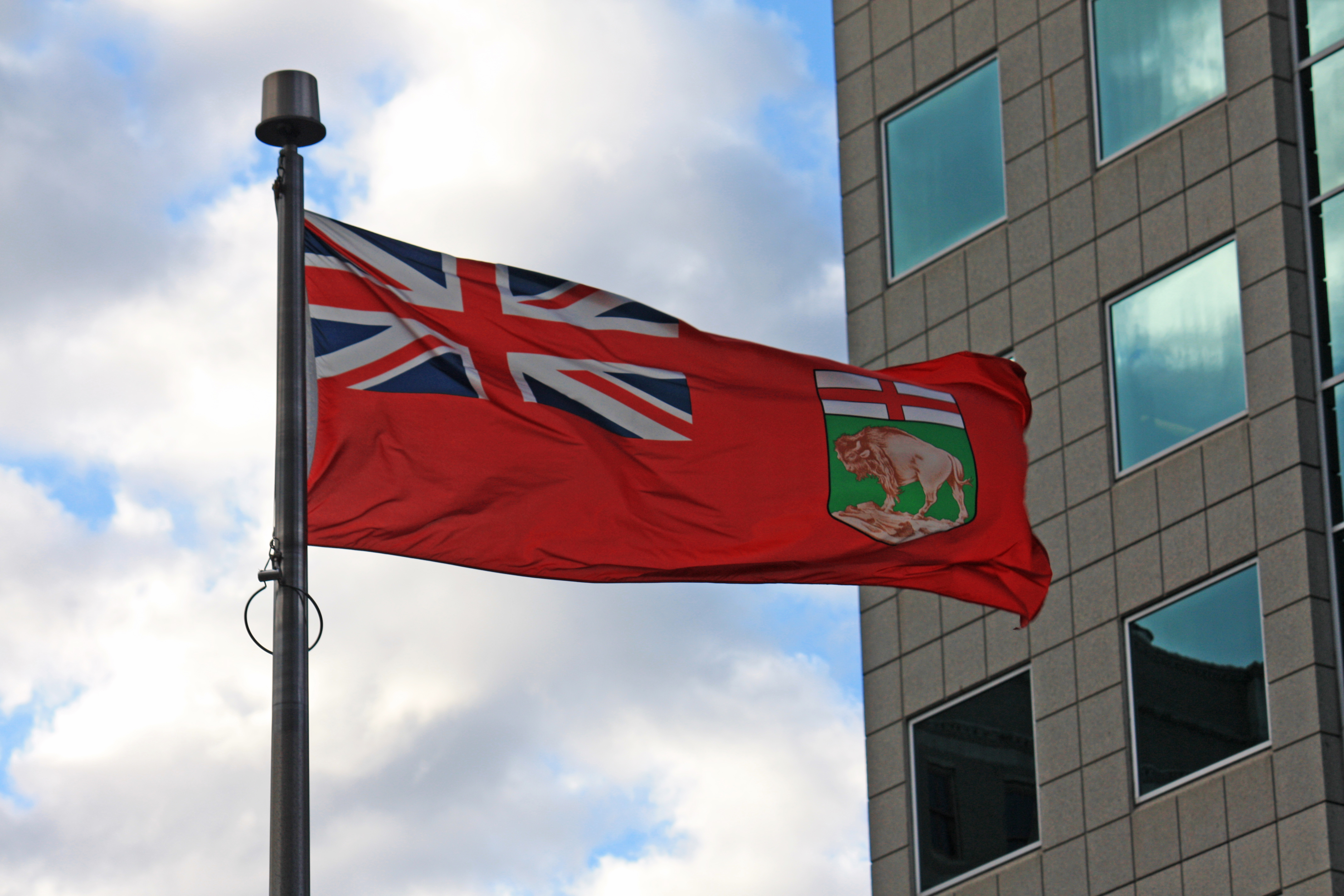
The Manitoban flag flying in Downtown Winnipeg.

Advice regarding flag etiquette is the responsibility of the province's Protocol Office. When flown together with the flag of Canada and the other provincial and territorial flags, the flag of Manitoba is sixth in the order of precedence (after the national flag and, in descending order of precedence, the flags of Ontario, Quebec, Nova Scotia, and New Brunswick). This is because it was the fifth province to enter into Confederation, and the first one to join after the establishment of the Dominion on July 1, 1867.

In addition to the dates set out by the federal government for flying flags at half-mast, the provincial flag is half-masted upon the death of the Lieutenant Governor or premier (either an incumbent or a previous one) and may also be flown in such a manner when an individual honoured by Manitoba dies. Moreover, the flags situated at the province's Legislative Building are lowered to half-mast upon the death of a soldier who was born or raised in Manitoba, or who was last stationed in the province before being deployed abroad.

== See also ==
- Coat of arms of Manitoba
- Symbols of Manitoba
