= Order of Manitoba =

Civilian honour for merit in Canada

- Insignia of the Order of Manitoba

Awarded by the lieutenant governor of Manitoba
- Type: Order of merit (provincial)
- Founded: 4 July 1999
- Eligibility: Any Canadian citizen presently or formerly residing in Manitoba, save for politicians and judges while they hold office.
- Awarded for: Excellence and achievement in any field that benefits the well being of Manitoba and its residents.
- Status: Currently constituted
- Founder: Peter Liba
- Chancellor: Anita Neville
- Grades: Member
- Post-nominals: OM

Statistics
- Total inductees: 157 (As of July 2011)

Precedence
- Next (higher): Order of Prince Edward Island
- Next (lower): Order of New Brunswick
- Ribbon bar of the order

The Order of Manitoba (Note: French: Ordre du Manitoba) is a civilian honour for merit in the Canadian province of Manitoba. Instituted in 1999 when Lieutenant Governor Peter Liba granted royal assent to the Order of Manitoba Act, the order is administered by the Governor-in-Council and is intended to honour current or former Manitoba residents for conspicuous achievements in any field, being thus described as the highest honour amongst all others conferred by the Manitoba Crown.

== Structure and appointment ==
The Order of Manitoba is intended to honour any current or former longtime resident of Manitoba who has demonstrated a high level of individual excellence and achievement in any field, "benefiting in an outstanding manner the social, cultural or economic well being of Manitoba and its residents"; it replaced in this role the Order of the Buffalo Hunt, which had more liberal standards of admission. There are no limits on how many can belong to the order, though inductions are limited to eight per year; Canadian citizenship is a requirement and those who are elected or appointed members of a governmental body are ineligible as long as they hold office.

The process of finding qualified individuals begins with submissions from the public to the Secretary of the Order of Manitoba Advisory Council, which consists of the Chief Justice of Manitoba; the Clerk of the Executive Council; the presidents of the University of Manitoba, Brandon University, and the University of Winnipeg, each serving for rotating two-year terms; and no more than four Members of the Order of Manitoba, one of whom serves as the chairperson of the council. If the chief justice is unable to serve on the council for any reason, the Chief Justice of the Court of King's Bench of Manitoba may serve instead. This committee then meets at least once annually to make its selected recommendations to the lieutenant governor; posthumous nominations are not accepted, though an individual who dies after his or her name was submitted to the Advisory Council can still be retroactively made a Member of the Order of Manitoba. The lieutenant governor, ex officio a Member and the Chancellor of the Order of Manitoba, then makes all appointments into the fellowship's single grade of membership by an Order in Council that bears the viceroyal sign-manual and the Great Seal of the province. Thereafter, the new Members are entitled to use the post-nominal letters OM.

== Insignia ==
Upon admission into the Order of Manitoba, usually in a ceremony held at Government House in Winnipeg, new Members are presented with the order's insignia. The main badge consists of a gold medallion in the form of a stylized crocus—the official provincial flower—with the obverse in white enamel with gold edging, and bearing at its centre the escutcheon of the arms of Manitoba, all surmounted by a St. Edward's Crown symbolizing the Canadian monarch's role as the fount of honour. The ribbon is patterned with vertical stripes in red, blue, and white; men wear the medallion suspended from this ribbon at the collar, while women carry theirs on a ribbon bow at the left chest. Members also receive a lapel pin that can be worn during less formal occasions.

== See also ==
- Symbols of Manitoba
- Orders, decorations, and medals of the Canadian provinces
- Canadian honours order of wearing
