= Regimental symbol =

A regimental symbol is a distinguishing emblem used by soldiers during times of war. Usually, it is some easily identifiable icon that can be displayed on uniforms, vehicles, and buildings to alert others of the nationality of the respective military force.

Regimental symbols are particularly common in colonies, which often lack distinctive icons of their own, such as flags.

== Regimental symbols ==
- Canada: maple leaf
- New Zealand: silver fern
- Australia: kangaroo
