= Rupert's Land =

Territory in British North America (1670–1870)

Coordinates: 57°00′N 92°18′W

Prince Rupert's Land
- Territory of British America and British North America
- 1670–1870
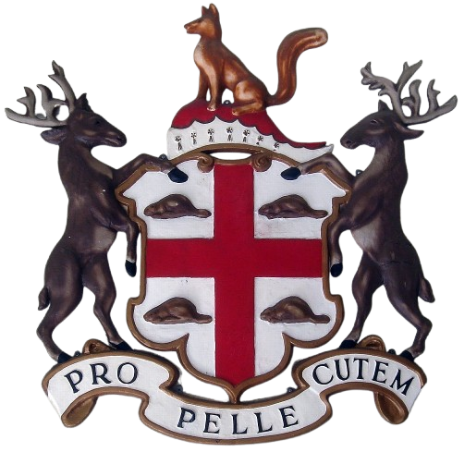
- Flag of the Hudson's Bay Company (1801–1965) Coat of arms of the Hudson's Bay Company

- Map of Rupert's Land, showing the location of York Factory
- Government
  - Type: Trading company
- Monarch
  - 1670–1685 (first): Charles II
  - 1837–1870 (last): Victoria
- HBC Governor
  - 1670–1682 (first): Rupert of the Rhine
  - 1870 (last): Stafford Northcote
- Historical era: Age of Discovery; Early Modern Period; Victorian Era
  - Established: 1670
  - Disestablished: 15 July 1870
Succeeded by
Canada
- Today part of: Canada; Alberta; Manitoba; Northwest Territories; Nunavut; Ontario; Quebec; Saskatchewan; United States; Minnesota; North Dakota; South Dakota; Montana

Rupert's Land (French: Terre de Rupert), or Prince Rupert's Land (French: Terre du Prince Rupert), was a territory in British America (British North America after 1783) based on the Hudson Bay drainage basin. The right to "sole trade and commerce" over Rupert's Land was granted to the Hudson's Bay Company (HBC), based at York Factory, effectively giving that company a commercial monopoly and territorial control over the area. The territory operated for 200 years from 1670 to 1870. Its namesake was Prince Rupert of the Rhine, who was a nephew of King Charles I and the first governor of the HBC. In December 1821, the HBC monopoly was extended from Rupert's Land to the Pacific coast.

The areas formerly belonging to Rupert's Land lie mostly within what is today Canada, and included the whole of Manitoba, most of Saskatchewan, southern Alberta, southern Nunavut, and northern parts of Ontario and Quebec. Additionally, it also extended into areas that are now parts of Minnesota, North Dakota, and Montana. The southern border, west of Lake of the Woods to the Rocky Mountains was the drainage divide between the Mississippi and Red/Saskatchewan watersheds until the Anglo-American Convention of 1818 substituted the 49th parallel.

== Formation ==
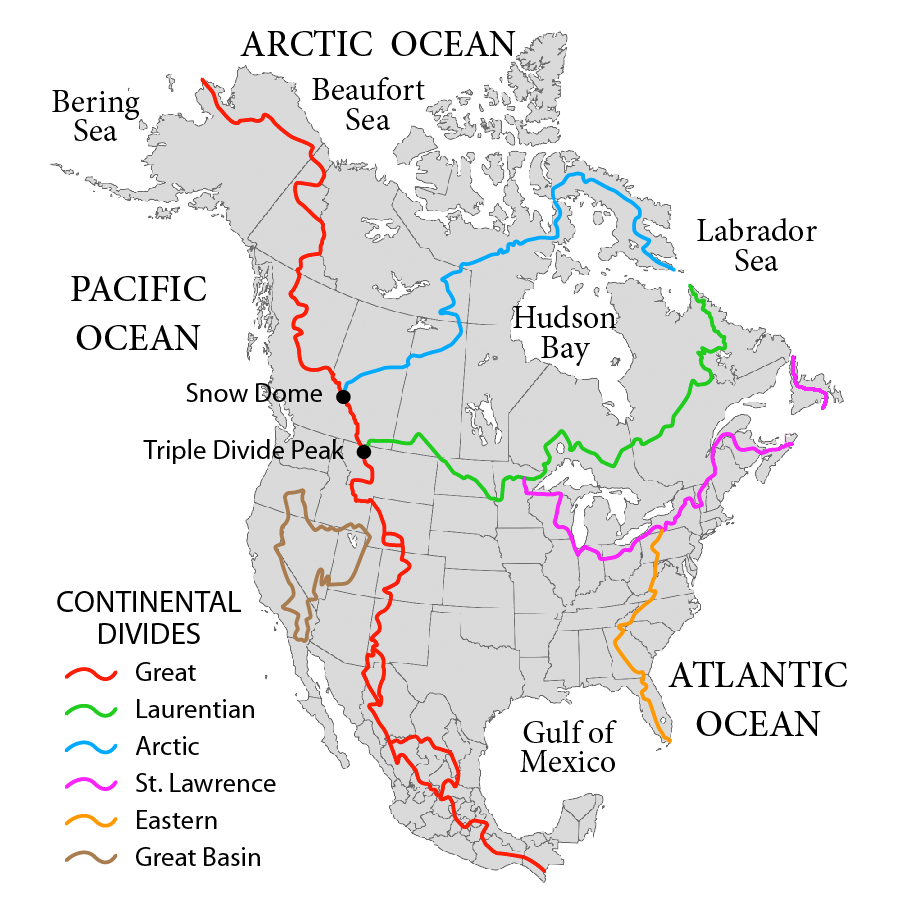
The Hudson Bay drainage basin connects primarily to the Labrador Sea just south of Davis Strait as depicted on most atlases such as those of the National Geographic Society just north of the 60th parallel north and northeast of the Labrador Peninsula

Under the principles of the European doctrine of discovery, after the English visited and explored Hudson's Bay, they could claim any lands found that were not already owned or possessed by other European or Christian nations. England claimed ownership of the lands surrounding Hudson's Bay. After explorations in 1659, Prince Rupert took interest in the Hudson's Bay region. The 1668–1669 expedition of the Nonsuch to the Hudson's Bay area returned with £1,400 (equivalent to £263,811 in 2025) worth of furs. However, England was not ready to organize a government on those lands. Instead, a "Company of Adventurers of England" was formed to administer those lands for England, thereby taking possession.

In 1670, King Charles II of England granted a royal charter to create the Hudson's Bay Company, under the governorship of Prince Rupert, the king's cousin. According to the Charter, the HBC received rights to:

The sole Trade and Commerce of all those Seas, Streights, Bays, Rivers, Lakes, Creeks, and Sounds, in whatsoever Latitude they shall be, that lie within the entrance of the Streights commonly called Hudson's Streights, together with all the Lands, Countries and Territories, upon the Coasts and Confines of the Seas, Streights, Bays, Lakes, Rivers, Creeks and Sounds, aforesaid, which are not now actually possessed by any of our Subjects, or by the Subjects of any other Christian Prince or State [...] and that the said Land be from henceforth reckoned and reputed as one of our Plantations or Colonies in America, called Rupert's Land.

The Charter applied to all lands within the drainage basin of Hudson's Bay. It spanned an area of about 3,861,400 square kilometres (1,490,900 sq mi), more than a third of all of today's Canada.

The royal charter made the "Governor and Company ... and their Successors, the true and absolute Lords and Proprietors, of the same Territory", and granted them the authority "to erect and build such Castles, Fortifications, Forts, Garrisons, Colonies or Plantations, Towns or Villages, in any Parts or Places within the Limits and Bounds granted before in these Presents, unto the said Governor and Company, as they in their Discretion shall think fit and requisite". In 1821, following the merger with the North West Company, the Hudson's Bay Company's monopoly privileges and licence were extended to trade over the North-Western Territory.

== Operation ==
=== Economy ===
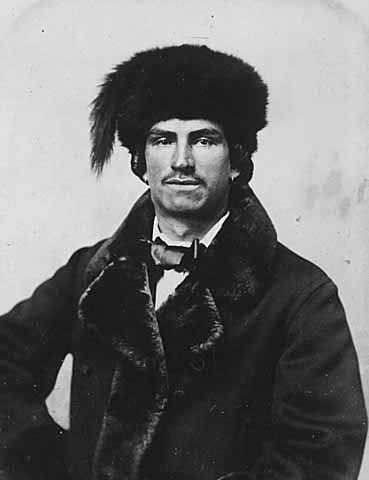
Métis fur trader, c. 1870

The Hudson's Bay Company dominated trade in Rupert's Land during the 18th–19th centuries and drew on the local population for many of its employees. This necessarily meant the hiring of many First Nations and Métis workers. Fuchs (2002) discusses the activities of these workers and the changing attitudes that the company had toward them. While George Simpson, one of the most noted company administrators, held a particularly dim view of mixed-blood workers and kept them from attaining positions in the company higher than postmaster, later administrators, such as James Anderson and Donald Ross, sought avenues for the advancement of indigenous employees.

Morton (1962) reviews the pressures at work on that part of Rupert's Land where Winnipeg now stands, a decade before its incorporation into Canada. It was a region completely given over to the fur trade, divided between the Hudson's Bay Company and private traders, with some incursions by the rival North West Company based in Montreal. There was strong business and political agitation in Upper Canada for annexing the territory; in London the company's trading license was due for review; in St. Paul there was a growing interest in the area as a field for U.S. expansion. The great commercial depression of 1857 dampened most of the outside interests in the territory, which itself remained comparatively prosperous.

=== Governance ===
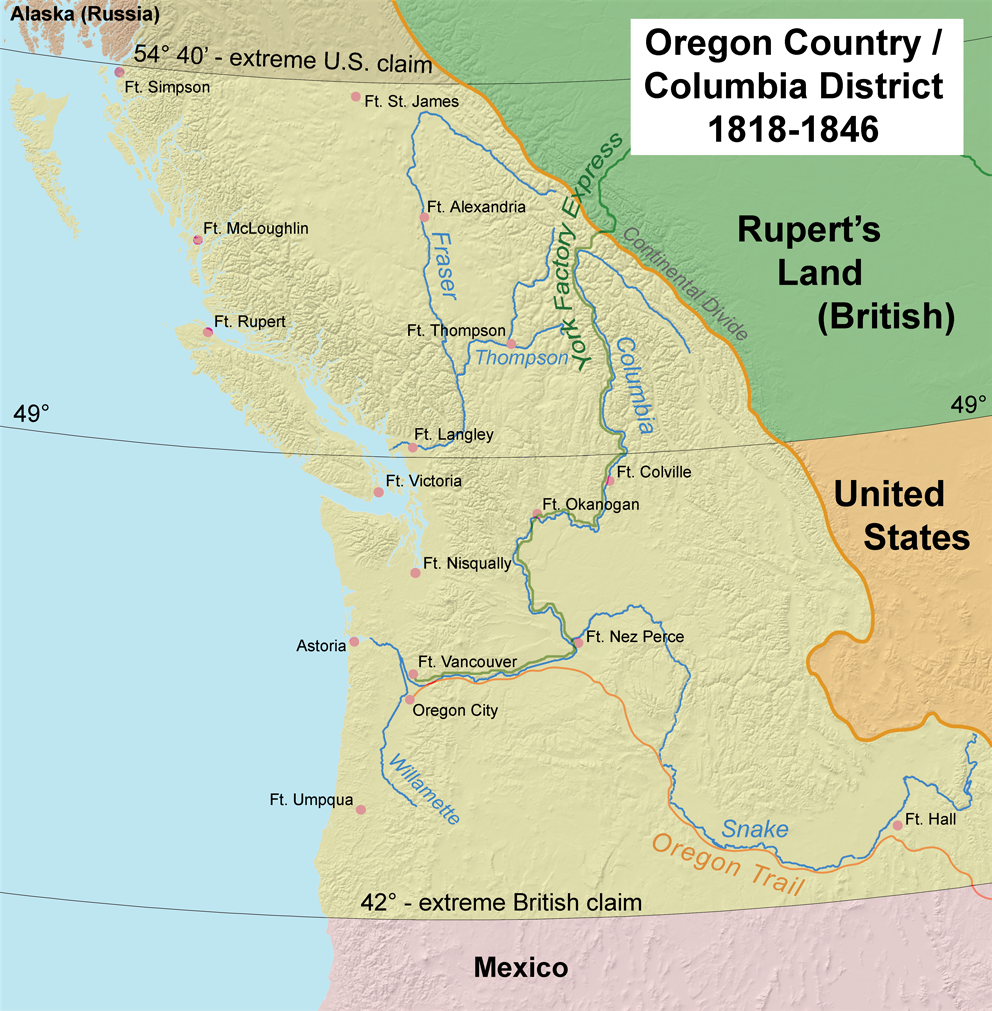
Map of the Columbia District, also referred to as Oregon Country

Before 1835, the Hudson's Bay Company had no formal legal system in Rupert's Land, creating "courts" on an ad hoc basis. The Hudson's Bay Company's "laws" in the 17th and 18th centuries had been the regulations setting out the rules governing the relationships between various employees in the company's posts in Rupert's Land and to interact with Indigenous peoples. The 1670 charter granting the company control of Rupert's Land had said trials were to be conducted by the governor of Rupert's Land together with three of his councillors. There were only three cases before the 19th century with the one with the most detailed notes being the trial of one Thomas Butler in 1715 at the York Factory who was convicted of theft, slander and fornication with a native woman. In the early 19th century, the HBC had waged the Pemmican War with the rival North West Company based in Montreal for the control of the fur trade culminating in the Battle of Seven Oaks of 1816, which led to an investigation by the House of Commons of the United Kingdom, and which in turn led to the Second Canada Jurisdiction Act 1821, ordering the Hudson's Bay Company to establish justice of the peace courts in Rupert's Land. Instead of establishing courts, the company directed the governor and the council of Assiniboia to mediate disputes as they arose.

In 1839, the Hudson's Bay Company were convinced of the need to dispense formal justice throughout Rupert's Land and established a court at the Red River Colony, in the "District of Assiniboia", south of Lake Winnipeg. A recorder and president of the court would act as legal organizer, adviser, magistrate, and councillor and be responsible for the rationalization and formalization of Rupert's Land's judicial system. The first recorder was Adam Thom, who held the post until 1854, although relieved of most of his duties by his deputy some years before. He was succeeded as President of the Court from 1862 to 1870 by John Black.

Baker (1999) uses the Red River Colony, the only non-native settlement on the northwest prairies for most of the 19th century, as a site for critical exploration of the meaning of "law and order" on the Canadian frontier and for an investigation of the sources from which legal history might be rewritten as the history of legal culture. Previous historians have assumed that the Hudson's Bay Company's representatives designed and implemented a local legal system dedicated instrumentally to the protection of the company's fur trade monopoly and, more generally, to strict control of settlement life in the company's interests. But this view is not borne out by archival research. Examination of Assiniboia's juridical institutions in action reveals a history formed less through the imposition of authority from above than by obtaining support from below. Baker shows that the legal history of the Red River Colony – and, by extension, of the Canadian West in general – is based on English common law.

Following the forced merger of the North West Company with the HBC in 1821, British Parliament applied the laws of Upper Canada to Rupert's Land and the Columbia District and gave enforcement power to the HBC. The Hudson's Bay Company maintained peace in Rupert's Land for the benefit of the fur trade; the Plains Indians had achieved a rough balance of power among themselves; the organization of the Métis provided internal security and a degree of external protection. This stable order broke down in the 1860s with the decline of the Hudson's Bay Company, smallpox epidemics and the arrival of American whisky traders on the Great Plains, and the disappearance of the bison. The rule of law was, after the transfer of Rupert's Land to Canada, enforced by the North-West Mounted Police.

=== Religious missions ===
Peake (1989) describes people, places, and activities that were involved in 19th-century Anglican missionary activities in the prairie areas of Rupert's Land, that huge portion of Canada controlled by the Hudson's Bay Company and inhabited by few Europeans. Early in the century, fur trade competition forced the company to expand into this interior region, and some officials saw advantages in allowing missionaries to accompany them. Officially they did not discriminate among denominations, but preference was often granted to the Anglicans of the Britain-based Church Missionary Society. The prairie missions extended from the area of 20th-century Winnipeg to the Mackenzie River delta in the north. Notable missionaries included Revd. John West, the first Protestant missionary to come to the area in 1820, David Anderson the first Bishop of Rupert's Land, William Bompas and the Native American Anglican priests: Henry Budd, James Settee, and Robert McDonald.

There were also Roman Catholic missions in Rupert's Land. One notable missionary was Alexandre-Antonin Taché, who both before and after his consecration as bishop worked as a missionary in Saint-Boniface, Île-à-la-Crosse, Fort Chipewyan, and Fort Smith.

== Transfer to Canada ==
The Rupert's Land Act 1868, which was passed by the Parliament of the United Kingdom, authorized the sale of Rupert's Land to Canada with the understanding that "'Rupert's Land' shall include the whole of the Lands and Territories held or claimed to be held by the" Hudson's Bay Company. The prevailing attitude of the time was that Rupert's Land was owned by the Hudson's Bay Company because "From the beginning to the end, the [Hudson's Bay Company] had always claimed up to the parallel 49", and argued that the royal charter and various acts of Parliament granted them "all the regions under British dominion watered by streams flowing into Hudson Bay". Rupert's Land had been essentially a private continental estate covering 3.9 million km^{2} in the heart of North America that stretched from the Atlantic to the Rocky Mountains, and from the prairies to the Arctic Circle. Even John A. Macdonald, the then Prime Minister of Canada, saw the land as being sold to Canada: "No explanation has been made of the arrangement by which the country (Rupert's Land) is handed over to the Queen, and that it is her Majesty who transfers the country to Canada with the same rights to settlers as existed before. All these poor people know is that Canada has bought the Country from the Hudson's Bay Company, and that they are handed over like a flock of sheep to us".

In 1869–1870, when the Hudson's Bay Company surrendered its charter to the British Crown, it received £300,000 in compensation. Control was originally planned to be transferred on 1 December 1869, but due to the premature action of the new lieutenant governor, William McDougall, the people of Red River formed a provisional government that took control until arrangements could be negotiated by leaders of what is known as the Red River Rebellion and the newly formed government of Canada. As a result of the negotiations, Canada asserted control on 15 July 1870.

The transaction was three-cornered. On 19 November 1869, the company surrendered its charter under its letters patent to the British Crown, which was authorized to accept the surrender by the Rupert's Land Act. By order-in-council dated 23 June 1870, the British government admitted the territory to Canada, under s. 146 of the Constitution Act, 1867, effective 15 July 1870, subject to the making of treaties with the sovereign indigenous nations to provide their consent to the Imperial Crown to exercise its sovereignty pursuant to the limitations and conditions of the Rupert's Land documents and the treaties. Lastly, the Government of Canada compensated the Hudson's Bay Company £300,000 (£35,977,894 pound sterling in 2019 money, or $60,595,408 Canadian dollars) for the surrender of its charter on the terms set out in the order-in-council.

The company retained its most successful trading posts and one-twentieth of the lands surveyed for immigration and settlement.

== Aboriginal title ==
At the time of the royal charter and the later Rupert's Land Act 1868, the Crown held the attitude that it already held sovereignty over the land from a people who only had a "personal and usufructuary right, dependent upon the good will of the Sovereign".

In 1927, the Supreme Court of Canada held that the terms of the Charter had granted ownership of all the land in the Hudson Bay drainage to the company, including all precious minerals. However, this ruling did not settle the issue of aboriginal title over the land. The Calder v British Columbia (AG) case in 1973 was the first case in Canadian law that acknowledged that "a declaration that the aboriginal title, otherwise known as the Indian title, of the plaintiffs to their ancient tribal territory hereinbefore described, has never been lawfully extinguished".

== See also ==
- 49th parallel north
- Archives of Manitoba
- British Arctic Territories
- Canadian canoe routes
- Former colonies and territories in Canada
- Royal eponyms in Canada

== Bibliography ==
- Baker, H. Robert (1999). "Creating Order In The Wilderness: Transplanting the English Law to Rupert's Land, 1835–51". Law and History Review. 17 (2). American Society for Legal History: 209–246. doi:10.2307/744011. ISSN 1939-9022. JSTOR 744011. S2CID 145502145." Summer.
- Plamondon, Bob (2013). "Chapter 2: Forging a Nation". Blue Thunder: The Truth about Conservatives from Macdonald to Harper. eBookIt.com. ISBN 9781456620523.
- Spencer, Charles (2007). Prince Rupert: The Last Cavalier. London, England: Phoenix. ISBN 978-0-297-84610-9.
