= Coat of arms of Manitoba =

Canadian provincial heraldic symbol

Arms of His Majesty The King in Right of Manitoba

Versions
- Escutcheon-only

- For use by the lieutenant governor of Manitoba

- The unofficial arms, in use until 1905
- Armiger: Charles III in Right of Manitoba
- Adopted: 1905, augmented 1992
- Crest: Upon a helm in trian aspect Or mantled Gules doubled Argent and wreathed of these colours a beaver sejeant upholding with its back a representation of the Royal Crown proper its dexter forepaw raised holding a prairie crocus (Anemone patens) slipped also proper.
- Shield: Vert on a Rock a Bison statant proper, on a Chief Argent the cross of St. George.
- Supporters: Dexter a unicorn Argent armed crined and unguled Or gorged with a mural coronet Vert masoned and encircled with maple leaves Argent pendant therefrom the wheel of a Red River cart Vert sinister a horse Argent crined queued and unguled Or gorged with a collar of Prairie Indian beadwork proper pendant therefrom a cycle of life medallion Vert
- Compartment: A mound bearing seven prairie crocuses slipped proper between to the dexter a wheat field Or and to the sinister a forest of white spruce (Picea glauca) proper the whole rising above barry wavy Argent and Azure
- Motto: Gloriosus et liber (Latin for 'glorious and free')
- Earlier version(s): Vert three garbs in fess Or, a chief per pale, dexter the Union Badge of 1707, sinister azure three fleurs-de-lis Or

The coat of arms of Manitoba is the heraldic symbol representing the Canadian province of Manitoba. The arms contains symbols reflecting Manitoba's British heritage along with local symbols. At the upper part of the shield is the red cross of St. George, representing England. On the left, the unicorn represents Scotland. The lower portion of the shield features a bison standing atop a rock on a green background, a symbol of First Nations peoples of the area who derived food and clothing from the animal.

The shield also features on the provincial flag.

== History ==
Prior to 1905, Manitoba used unofficial arms blazoned Vert three garbs in fess Or, a chief per pale, dexter the Union Badge of 1707 (i.e. the crosses of St. George and St. Andrew), sinister azure three fleurs-de-lis Or.

The present shield of arms was granted by royal warrant of King Edward VII on 10 May 1905.

The arms were further augmented with supporters, a crest, and motto, by a warrant of then-Governor General Ramon Hnatyshyn on 23 October 1992.

== Symbolism ==
Crest
The helmet above the shield is gold and faces left, a symbol of Manitoba's co-sovereign status in Confederation. The mantling is in the national colours of Canada. The crest is a beaver, Canada's national animal, holding a prairie crocus, Manitoba's provincial flower. The crest is surmounted by a crown, representing royal sovereignty.
Shield
On the white chief is Saint George's Cross, a symbol of England. The bison is a symbolic reminder of the various bison that formerly roamed the province. The remainder of the coat of arms was granted in 1992. The shield also appears on Manitoba's flag.
Compartment
The compartment represents a diverse landscape.
Supporters
The beadwork and Red River cart wheel allude to Manitoba's past, while the maple leaf is the national emblem of Canada.
Motto
The motto is gloriosus et liber (Latin for 'glorious and free'), a line taken from the English lyrics to the Canadian national anthem, "O Canada."
Animals
Beaver, bison, horse, unicorn

== See also ==
- Symbols of Manitoba
- Flag of Manitoba
- Canadian heraldry
- National symbols of Canada
- List of Canadian provincial and territorial symbols
- Heraldry
