= Flag of Ontario =

Canadian provincial flag

Ontario
- Use: Civil and state flag
- Proportion: 1∶2
- Adopted: April 14, 1965; 61 years ago
- Design: A red field with the flag of the Royal Union Flag in the canton defaced with the shield of the Ontario coat of arms.
- Variant Flag
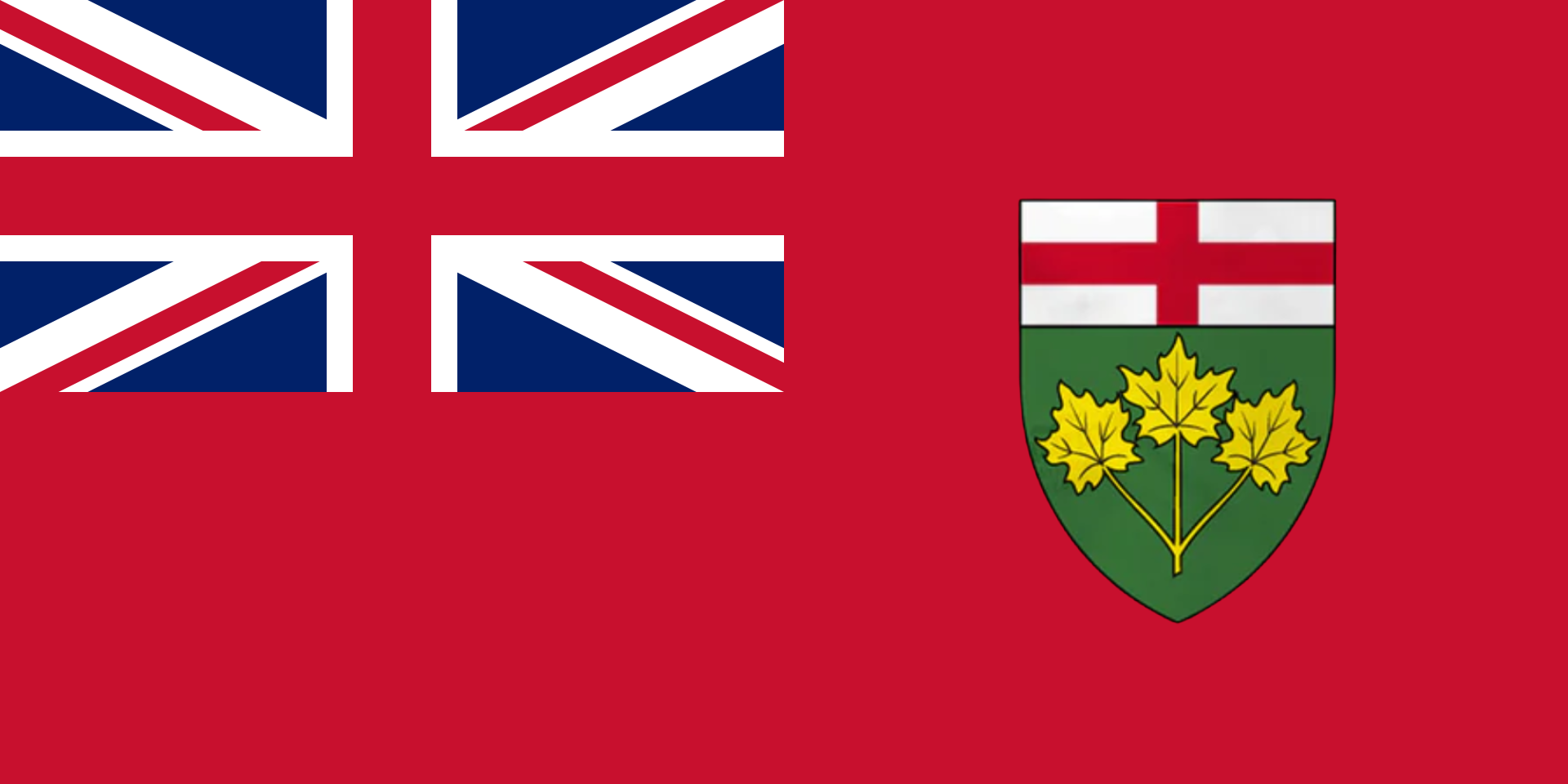
- Use: Civil and state flag
- Proportion: 1∶2
- Design: British red ensign defaced with the escutcheon of Ontario. Contains noticeably thicker and more realistic maple leaves.

The flag of Ontario is a defaced Red Ensign, with the Royal Union Flag in the canton and the Ontario shield of arms in the fly. The flag of Ontario was derived from the Canadian Red Ensign that was used as a civil ensign and the flag of Canada from the late 19th century to 1965. When the new Canadian Flag replaced the old in 1965, Ontario changed the Canadian arms on the former national flag to the Ontario arms. May 21 is Ontario Flag Day.

== Description ==
The lesser arms of Ontario, which defaces the fly of the flag of Ontario.

The flag of Ontario is a defacement of the Canadian Red Ensign, which had been the de facto national flag of Canada from 1867 to 1965. The flag is a red field with the Royal Union Flag in the canton and the Ontario shield of arms in the fly. The coat of arms of Ontario had been previously granted by Royal Warrant of Queen Victoria in 1868. It features a green field with three gold maple leaves and above it, a white band with a red Saint George's Cross.

The specifications of the flag are 1:2. The shade of red in the flag is specified as "British Admiralty Colour Code No. T1144 for nylon worsted bunting and No. T818A for other bunting." The shield of the coat of arms is "centred in the half farthest from the staff".

== History ==
Flags of Canada and Ontario in Temagami

Before 1965, the Canadian Red Ensign had served as the de facto national flag of Canada. It was flown at all military installations in Canada and overseas, embassies and consulates, outside the legislature and government buildings, at Royal Canadian Legion halls, and many private homes.

In 1964, the Canadian Parliament, after a long and acrimonious debate, adopted the Maple Leaf flag as the flag of Canada. The preceding national flag debate was very divisive and the change of flag was unpopular with many Canadians. A Gallup poll of April 1963 indicated that a majority of Canadians outside of Quebec preferred to retain either the Union Jack or the Red Ensign as the national flag. Another poll, in August 1964, indicated that less than 40% of Ontarians approved of the new flag. Many felt, however, that changing the national flag was a worthwhile concession towards bringing Quebec more closely into Confederation.

The proposal that the Red Ensign, or a variant thereof, would be an appropriate provincial flag was first made in an editorial in the Toronto Star in May 1964, six months prior to the adoption of the new Maple Leaf flag. The idea was supported by Leslie Frost, former premier of Ontario, and Richard Rohmer, the advisor of then-Premier John Robarts. It was originally intended to place the full Ontario Coat of Arms on the flag, but this was later reduced to only the shield.

A tireless proponent of national unity, Robarts sought to use the Red Ensign design to reconcile the majority of Ontarians who opposed the new national flag. The Ensign did not take anything from proponents of the new flag, and it gave something to those who supported the traditional flag. Robarts felt it was an important symbol that reflected Ontario's heritage and the sacrifices made under it by Canadian troops. He stated that "without conflict with the flag of Canada, there is an honoured place within our provincial boundaries for a provincial flag for Ontario. Here, in our province, there is a rich heritage of tradition and historic background which we do well to recognize".

Variant of the Canadian Red Ensign used from 1957 to 1965; the design for the flag of Ontario was derived from this Canadian Red Ensign.

The adoption of the new provincial flag commanded support of the leaders of both the Ontario Liberal Party and the Ontario New Democratic Party. All MPPs except two (Elmer Sopha decried it 'a flag of revenge' against the new national flag) voted to adopt the flag on the initial reading, and it was subsequently passed by the Legislative Assembly on March 17, 1965. It went in effect on May 21, 1965. The flag of Manitoba was adopted under similar circumstances.

On May 13, 2015, the Liberal MPP from Etobicoke Centre Yvan Baker put forward the Ontario Flag Day Act, 2015. This bill, which passed the house and received royal assent on June 4 in the same year, declares May 21 every year as Ontario Flag Day.

== Reception ==
The Toronto Daily Star supported the adoption of the flag, stating "the Red Ensign was quite properly rejected as a flag for Canada because it was not an acceptable symbol of the nation as a whole. But it is much more suitable as a flag for Ontario". A 2001, a survey conducted by the North American Vexillological Association (NAVA) placed the Ontario provincial flag 43rd in design quality out of the 72 Canadian provincial, U.S. state, and U.S. territory flags ranked. The design of any flag, however, is entirely subjective and not easily compared according to some scholars such as Graham Bartram, chief vexillologist at the Flag Institute, who noted "There's often a fundamental misunderstanding of flags by politicians. Saying you like a flag because of its design is like saying you like your family because they are all handsome or beautiful. You love them because of who they are, unconditionally. Flags are a bit like that." This remark was made after a 2016 New Zealand flag referendum, in which New Zealanders voted to retain their existing flag, inclusive of the Union Jack.

The incorporation of traditional or historical symbols is often an important element in flag design. Bruce Patterson notes the continued significance of the Red Ensign within the context of Canadian flag design, "while not disparaging the current National Flag...the Red Ensign is worth considering as a part of our history, and after fifty years an acknowledgement of this is certainly not a threat to the position of the National Flag."

=== Redesign proposals ===
Some Commonwealth countries with the Union Jack in the canton have debated redesigning their national flags, such as in the case of the 2015–2016 New Zealand flag referendums. There has been comparatively less debate around re-designing the Ontario flag, although some commentators have made calls to change the flag. The justification is mainly around perceptions that the current flag centres colonialism and Old Stock Canadians. Most recently, in July 2021, University of Western Ontario Professor Mano Majumdar launched a petition to redesign the flag, stating that "the best flags are distinct and inclusive. Ontario's is neither" and calling for "the Ontario legislature to replace the provincial flag with a more distinct and inclusive flag, chosen by democratic means."

The petition also spurred support for the flag with one editorial encouraging pride in the flag as it was "a symbol of success." It was emblematic of the origin of Ontario's most successful institutions of British inheritance: parliamentary democracy, law and freedom. The editorial argued, using the flags of Fiji or Tuvalu as an example, that the Union Jack is not exclusive to any ethnic group and represents Ontarians of all backgrounds. It further suggested that the Union Jack could also symbolize the attaining of freedom for an estimated 30-40,000 escaped slaves reaching British North America on the Underground Railroad.

== Other flags of Ontario ==
Flag	Date	Use	Description
	1975–present (Note: The following date was when the flag was first flown. The flag was later adopted by the Francophone Assembly of Ontario in 1977, and was named as the official flag of the Franco-Ontarian community by provincial legislation in 2001. In 2020, the provincial legislation was amended, naming the Franco-Ontarian flag an official emblem of province.)	Franco-Ontarian flag	A vertical bicolour of green and white; charged with a white fleur-de-lys centred on the green portion and a trillium centred on the white portion
	1981–present	Standard of the lieutenant governor of Ontario	The escutcheon of Arms of Ontario, crowned, on a blue field, surrounded by ten golden maple leaves.
	1870–1959; 1965–1981	Former standard of the lieutenant governor of Ontario	The Union Jack defaced in the centre with a white circle containing the arms of Ontario and surrounded by a wreath of maple leaves.
	1959–1965	Former standard of the lieutenant governor of Ontario	The Canadian Red Ensign defaced in the lower fly by a white disk bearing the shield of the arms of Ontario surrounded by a wreath of green maple leaves.

== See also ==
- List of Canadian flags
- Flag of Manitoba, designed under similar political circumstances and likewise consisting of a Red Ensign defaced with that province's shield of arms
