= Holmesville Soil Series =

Holmesville Soil Series is the name given to a gravelly sandy loam or gravelly loam soil which has developed on glacial till in western New Brunswick, Canada. It belongs to the podzol soil group. The bedrock from which the parent material was derived is largely quartzite but includes considerable admixtures of argillite, slate, schist, and locally shale. This diversity of bedrock sources contributes to the fertility of this soil series, which is well drained yet moisture-retentive -- an ideal combination for farmers.

The Holmesville is a major agricultural soil which provides much of New Brunswick's potato output. Cattle are also raised for their beef and milk. A wide variety of trees grow well on this soil and support a lumber industry.

On 13 February 1997, the Province of New Brunswick designated the Holmesville Soil Series as its Provincial Soil.
