= Maple leaf =

Leaf of the maple tree

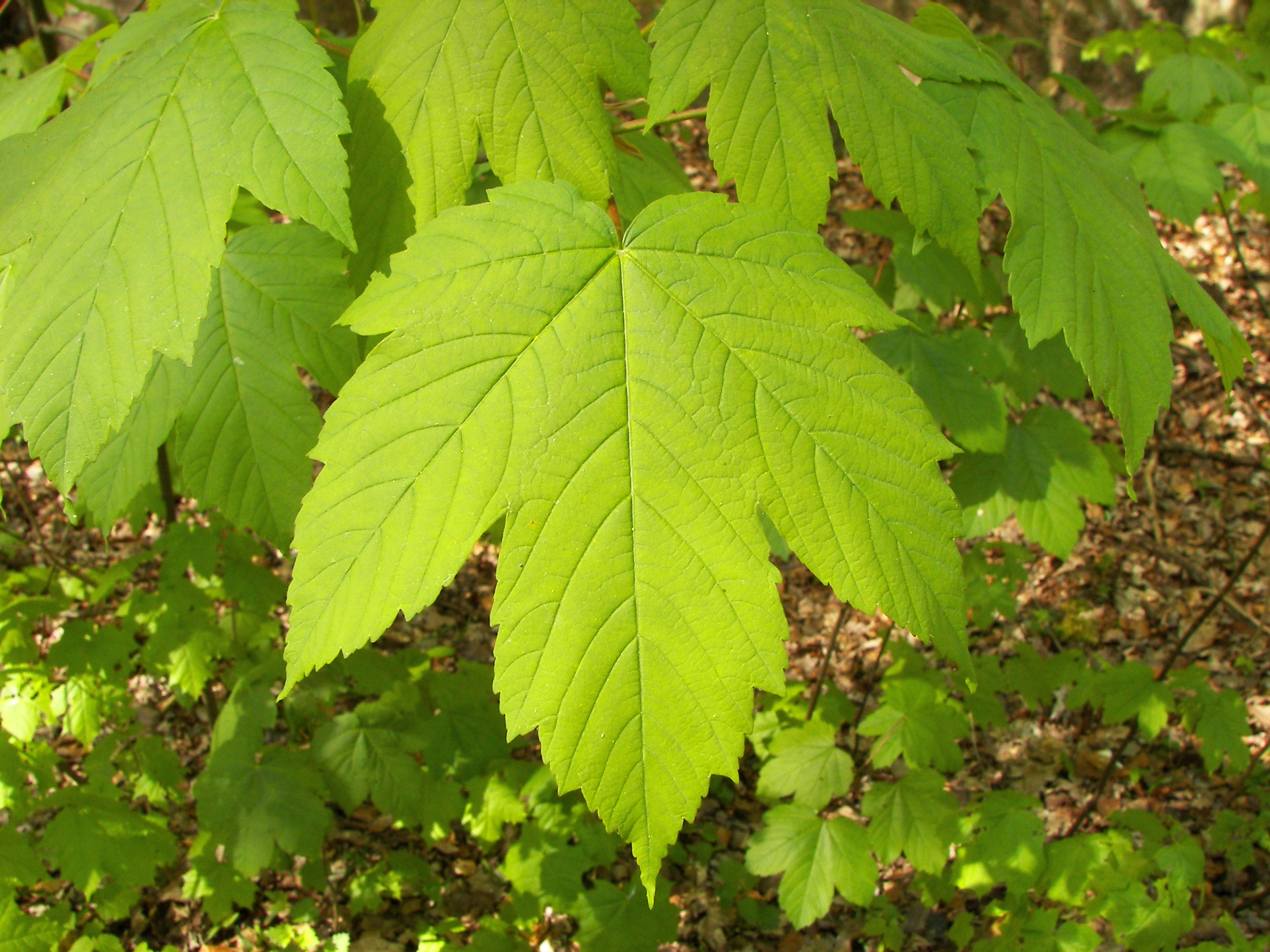
Leaves of the sycamore maple (Acer pseudoplatanus)

The maple leaf is the characteristic leaf of the maple tree. It is used as the national symbol of Canada.

== History of use in Canada ==
By the early 1700s, the maple leaf had been adopted as an emblem by the French Canadians along the Saint Lawrence River.

Its popularity with French Canadians continued and was reinforced when, at the inaugural meeting of the Saint-Jean-Baptiste Society in 1834, the maple leaf was one of numerous emblems proposed to represent the society. Speaking in its favour, Jacques Viger, the first mayor of Montreal, described the maple as "the king of our forest; ... the symbol of the Canadian people."

The Sovereign's Flag for Canada, showing a sprig of three maple leaves as part of the design

The flag of Canada, featuring one stylized maple leaf in the centre

The maple leaf slowly caught on as a national symbol. In 1868, it was included in the coat of arms of Ontario and the coat of arms of Quebec, and was added to the Canadian coat of arms in 1921. Historically, the golden maple leaf had represented Ontario, while the green maple leaf had represented Quebec. In 1867, Alexander Muir composed the patriotic song "The Maple Leaf Forever", which became an unofficial anthem in English-speaking Canada. From 1876 until 1901, the leaf appeared on all Canadian coins, and remained on the penny after 1901. The use of the maple leaf as a regimental symbol extended from the 1890s, and Canadian soldiers in the Second Boer War were distinguished by a maple leaf on their sun helmets. During the First World War, badges of the Canadian Expeditionary Force were often based on a maple leaf design. In 1957, the maple leaf colour on the Canadian arms was changed from green to red – some maple leaves are commonly red even in spring as they bud and no seasonal colouring has been assigned heraldically.

The maple leaf became the central national symbol with the introduction of the Canadian flag (suggested by George F. G. Stanley and sponsored by MP John Matheson) in 1965, which uses a highly stylized eleven-pointed maple leaf, referring to no specific species of maple. Earlier official uses of a maple leaf design often used more than 30 points and a short stem. The one chosen is a generic maple leaf representing the ten species of maple tree native to Canada – at least one of these species grows natively in every province. The maple leaf is used on the Canadian flag and by the Federal Government as a personification and identifier on its websites, as part of the government's wordmark.

The maple leaf is also used in logos of various Canadian-based companies (including Canadian subsidiaries of foreign companies and small local businesses) and the logos of Canadian sports teams. Examples include Air Canada, General Motors Canada, the Toronto Maple Leafs and Winnipeg Jets National Hockey League (NHL) franchises, the Toronto Blue Jays Major League Baseball (MLB) franchise, and the Toronto FC Major League Soccer (MLS) club. Some brands such as Wendy's Canada and McDonald's Canada incorporate a Maple Leaf into their corporate logos to distinguish the brand from their American counterparts.

The maple leaf is considered a certification mark on product labels in Canada, equivalent to "Product of Canada" which requires 98% of the total direct costs of the product to be incurred in Canada.

Since 1979, the Royal Canadian Mint has produced gold, silver, platinum, and palladium bullion coins, which are officially known as Maple Leafs, as geometric maple leaves are stamped on them. Signage for the Trans-Canada Highway uses a white maple leaf on a green background.

== Other uses ==
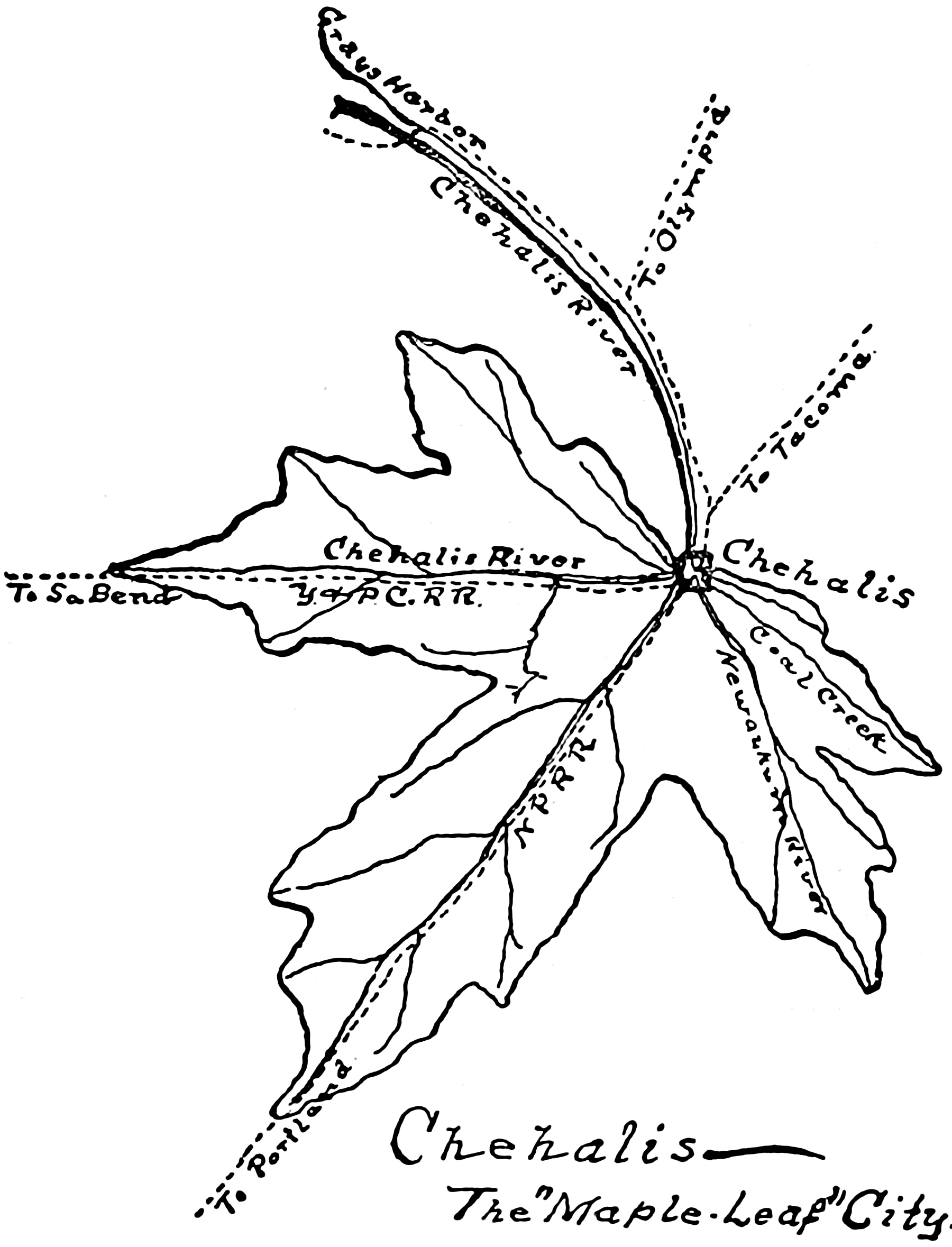
A map showing the Chehalis River, tributaries, and area railroads as forming the shape of a maple leaf

The Italian city of Campobasso was known as "Canada City" or in a minor way "Maple Leaf City", since during the Second World War, Canadian troops invaded the city and freed it from the Germans. Moreover, the city has a huge variety of maples which can be found even in the streets.

The U.S. city of Carthage, Missouri, is nicknamed "America's Maple Leaf City."

The city of Chehalis, Washington, United States, was known as "The Maple-Leaf City".

The mascot of Goshen College in Goshen, Indiana, United States, is the Maple Leaf and the nickname for Goshen College sports teams is the Maple Leafs.

It is usually taken as one of the featured symbols on the emblem of the Pakistani province of Azad Jammu and Kashmir, which is not correct. The actual featured symbol is a chinar leaf, with chinar being the Persian/Turkish/Urdu name for the oriental plane (Platanus orientalis), a large broad-leaved deciduous tree.

In the city of Minoh in Osaka Prefecture, Japan, momiji no tempura or deep-fried maple leaf is a specialty made from salted maple leaves whose invention is attributed to 7th-century mystic En no Gyōja.

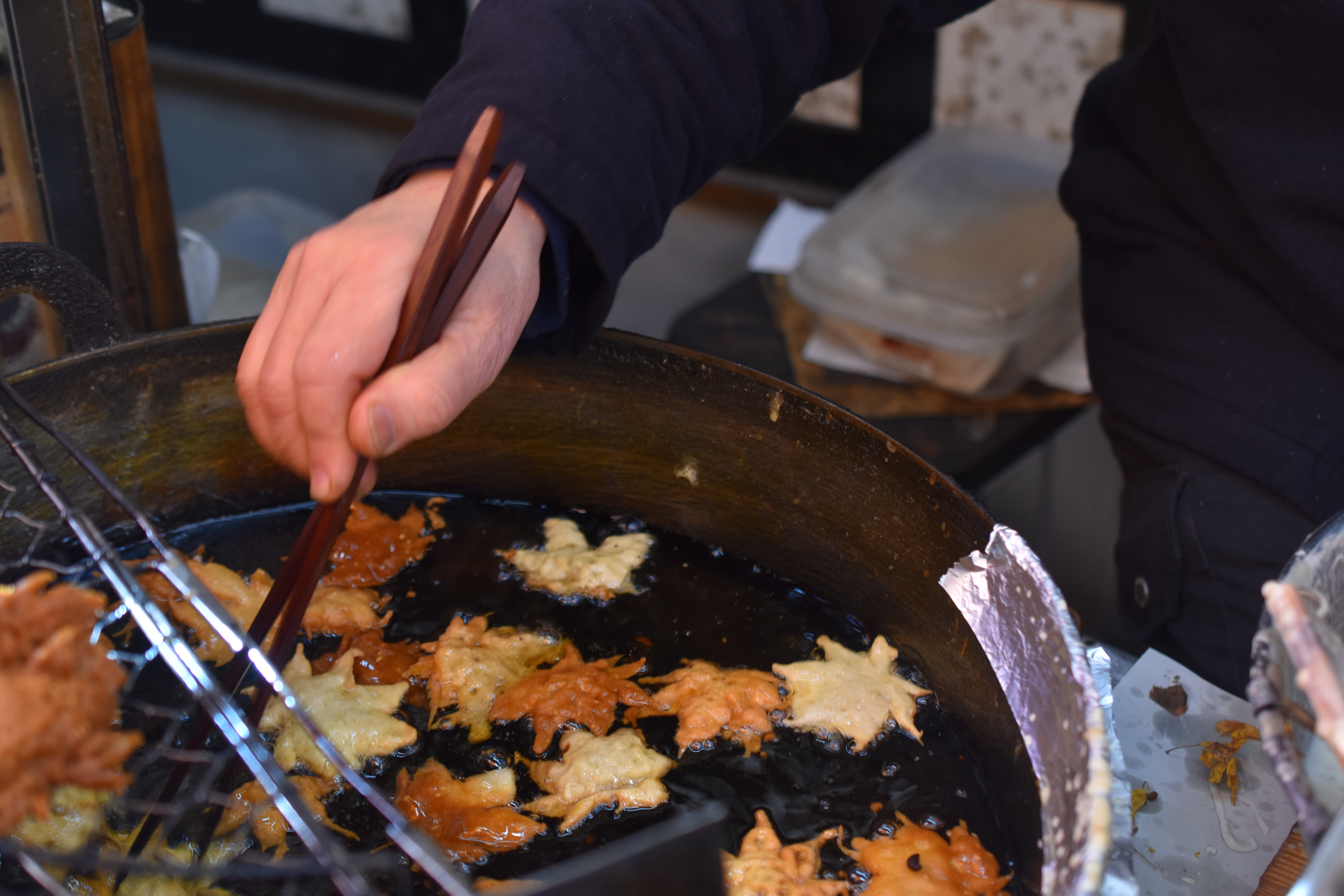
Momiji no tempura

In Estonia and Lithuania, inexperienced drivers are obliged to have a green maple leaf sign visible on the vehicle, serving a similar function that a P-plate does in some other countries.

The maple leaf was also featured on the coat of arms of Sammatti, Finland.
