= List of museums in Prince Edward Island =

This list of museums in Prince Edward Island contains museums which are defined for this context as institutions (including nonprofit organizations, government entities, and private businesses) that collect and care for objects of cultural, artistic, scientific, or historical interest and make their collections or related exhibits available for public viewing. Also included are non-profit art galleries and university art galleries. Museums that exist only in cyberspace (i.e., virtual museums) are not included.

Name	Town/City	County	Type	Summary
Acadian Museum	Miscouche	Prince	Ethnic	website, Acadian history and culture, operated by the Prince Edward Island Museum and Heritage Foundation
Alberton Museum	Alberton	Prince	Local history	website, local history
Anne of Green Gables Museum	Park Corner (near Cavendish)	Queens	Historic house	website (Internet Archive), known as "Silver Bush", 19th century home of the aunt and uncle of author Lucy Maud Montgomery; see also: new website
Basin Head Fisheries Museum	Souris	Kings	Maritime	website
Beaconsfield Historic House	Charlottetown	Queens	Historic house	website, late 19th century Victorian mansion
Bedeque Area Historical Museum	Bedeque and Area	Prince	Local history	website, operated by the Bedeque Area Historical SOciety
Bideford Parsonage Museum	Bideford	Prince	Historic house	website, late 19th century Victorian parsonage, where author Lucy Maud Montgomery boarded while teaching at the local school
Bishop's Machine Shop Museum	Summerside	Prince	History	website, historic machine shop and tools, operated by Wyatt Heritage Properties
Cape Bear Lighthouse & Marconi Museum	Murray Harbour	Kings	Maritime	website, lighthouse, replica of the Cape Bear Marconi Station and local history
Car Life Museum	Bonshaw	Queens	Automotive	Facebook site, restored cars and farm machinery
Confederation Centre Art Gallery	Charlottetown	Queens	Art	An art museum that forms a part of the Confederation Centre of the Arts
Ellerslie Shellfish Museum	Bideford	Prince	Natural history	Facebook site, area shellfish industry
Elmira Railway Museum	Elmira	Kings	Railway	website, island's railway heritage
Eptek Art & Culture Centre	Summerside	Prince	Multiple	website, changing art, science, culture and history exhibits
Fantazmagoric Museum of the Strange and Unusual	Cavendish	Queens	Amusement	information
Farmers' Bank of Rustico	Rustico	Queens	History	Local history, located in a former rural bank, also adjacent pioneer Doucet House
Garden of the Gulf Museum	Montague	Kings	History	information, information, local history
Green Gables	Park Corner (near Cavendish)	Queens	Farm	19th century farm and house that was the setting for the Anne of Green Gables novels by Lucy Maud Montgomery
Green Park Shipbuilding Museum	Port Hill	Prince	Maritime	website, shipbuilding industry and 19th century shipbuilder's Yeo House
Greenwich Interpretation Centre	Greenwich	Kings	History	website,
International Fox Museum	Summerside	Prince	Industry	website, area fox farming industry, operated by Wyatt Heritage Properties
Keir Memorial Museum	Malpeque	Prince	Local history	website, operated by the Malpeque Historical Society
Kensington Veterans Memorial Museum	Kensington	Prince	Military	information, adjacent to the Royal Canadian Legion, includes uniforms, medals, hand weapons, flags, photographs and maps
Lennox Island Mi'kmaq Cultural Centre	Lennox Island	Prince	First Nations	website, history and culture of the Mi'kmaq
Lucy Maud Montgomery Birthplace	New London	Queens	Biographical	website, mid 19th century period home with memorabilia and artifacts of author Lucy Maud Montgomery
Lucy Maud Montgomery Heritage Museum	Park Corner (near Cavendish)	Queens	Biographical	"/inglesidepeimuseum.html website, mid 19th century period family home of author Lucy Maud Montgomery, known as "Ingleside"
Lucy Maud Montgomery School Museum	Lower Bedeque	Prince	Education	information, re-creation of the one room schoolhouse where author Lucy Maud Montgomery taught
Macnaught History Centre	Summerside	Prince	History	website, local history, operated by Wyatt Heritage Properties
North Cape Wind Energy Interpretive Centre	North Cape	Prince	Multiple	website, wind energy, local history and culture, natural history
Orwell Corner Historic Village	Orwell	Queens	Open air	website, 1890s village, includes PEI Agricultural Heritage Museum
Prince Edward Island Potato Museum	O'Leary	Prince	Agriculture	website, history of the potato, potato farming, agriculture equipment, barn, chapel, schoolhouse, local history
Prince Edward Island Sports Hall of Fame & Museum	Summerside	Prince	Sports	website
Prince Edward Island Regimental Museum	Charlottetown	Queens	Military	History of The Prince Edward Island Regiment (RCAC)
Province House National Historic Site	Charlottetown	Queens	History	Birthplace of Canadian Confederation and the seat of Prince Edward Island's provincial legislature since 1847
Ripley's Believe It or Not!	Cavendish	Queens	Amusement	
Sir Andrew Macphail Homestead	Orwell	Queens	Historic house	Early 20th century period home of Andrew Macphail, physician, author and soldier
Tignish Cultural Centre	Tignish	Prince	History	information, local history
Tryon Museum	Tryon	Prince	Local history	website, operated by the Tryon & Area Historical Society
Victoria Seaport Lighthouse Museum	Victoria	Queens	Maritime	information, historic lighthouse and maritime exhibits
West Point Lighthouse Museum	West Point	Prince	Maritime	website, restored lighthouse, also serves as an inn
Wood Islands Lighthouse Museum	Wood Islands	Queens	Maritime	lighthouse and 1950s period lighthouse keepers quarters, area's maritime history
Wyatt House Museum	Summerside	Prince	Historic house	website, 19th century home with furnishing spanning 100 years, operated by Wyatt Heritage Properties

== Defunct museums ==
- Founders Hall, Charlottetown, closed in 2016
- Great Island Science & Adventure Park, Cavendish, closed in 2009, website

== See also ==
- Nature centres in Prince Edward Island
