= Lot 23, Prince Edward Island =

- Township
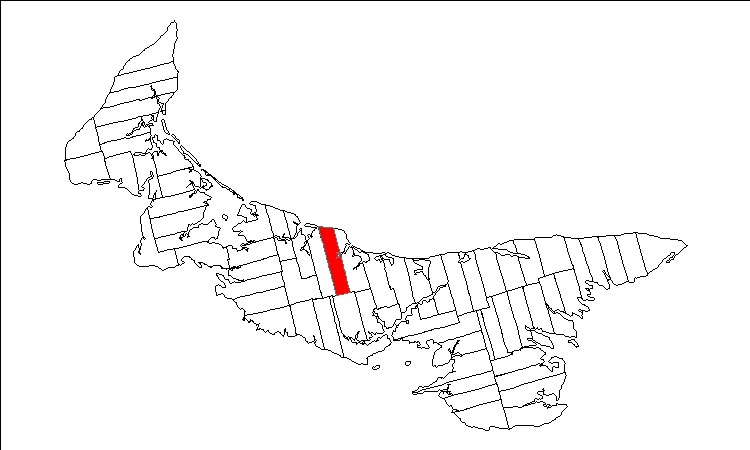
- Map of Prince Edward Island highlighting Lot 23
- Coordinates: 46°25′N 63°20′W
- Country: Canada
- Province: Prince Edward Island
- County: Queens County
- Parish: Greenville Parish

Area
  - Total: 70.92 km^{2} (27.38 sq mi)

Population (2006)
  - Total: 837
  - Density: 11.8/km^{2} (31/sq mi)
- Time zone: UTC-4 (AST)
  - Summer (DST): UTC-3 (ADT)
- Canadian Postal code: C0A
- Area code: 902
- NTS Map: 011L06
- GNBC Code: BAERJ

Lot 23 is a township in Queens County, Prince Edward Island, Canada. It is part of Greenville Parish. Lot 23 was awarded to Allan and Lauchlin MacLeane in the 1767 land lottery.

== Communities ==
Incorporated municipalities:

- Darlington
- Hunter River
- Stanley Bridge, Hope River, Bayview, Cavendish and North Rustico

Civic address communities:

- Cavendish
- Darlington
- Greenvale
- Hunter River
- Mayfield
- New Glasgow
- Rennies Road
- Rusticoville
- St. Ann
- Toronto
- Wheatley River

== Demographics ==
Historical population
Year	Pop.	±%
1871	1,804	—
1881	1,903	+5.5%
1891	1,835	−3.6%
1901	1,742	−5.1%
1911	1,434	−17.7%
1921	1,201	−16.2%
1931	1,258	+4.7%
1941	1,312	+4.3%
2006	837	−36.2%
