= Green Gables (Prince Edward Island) =

19th-century farm in Prince Edward Island, Canada

Green Gables Heritage Place
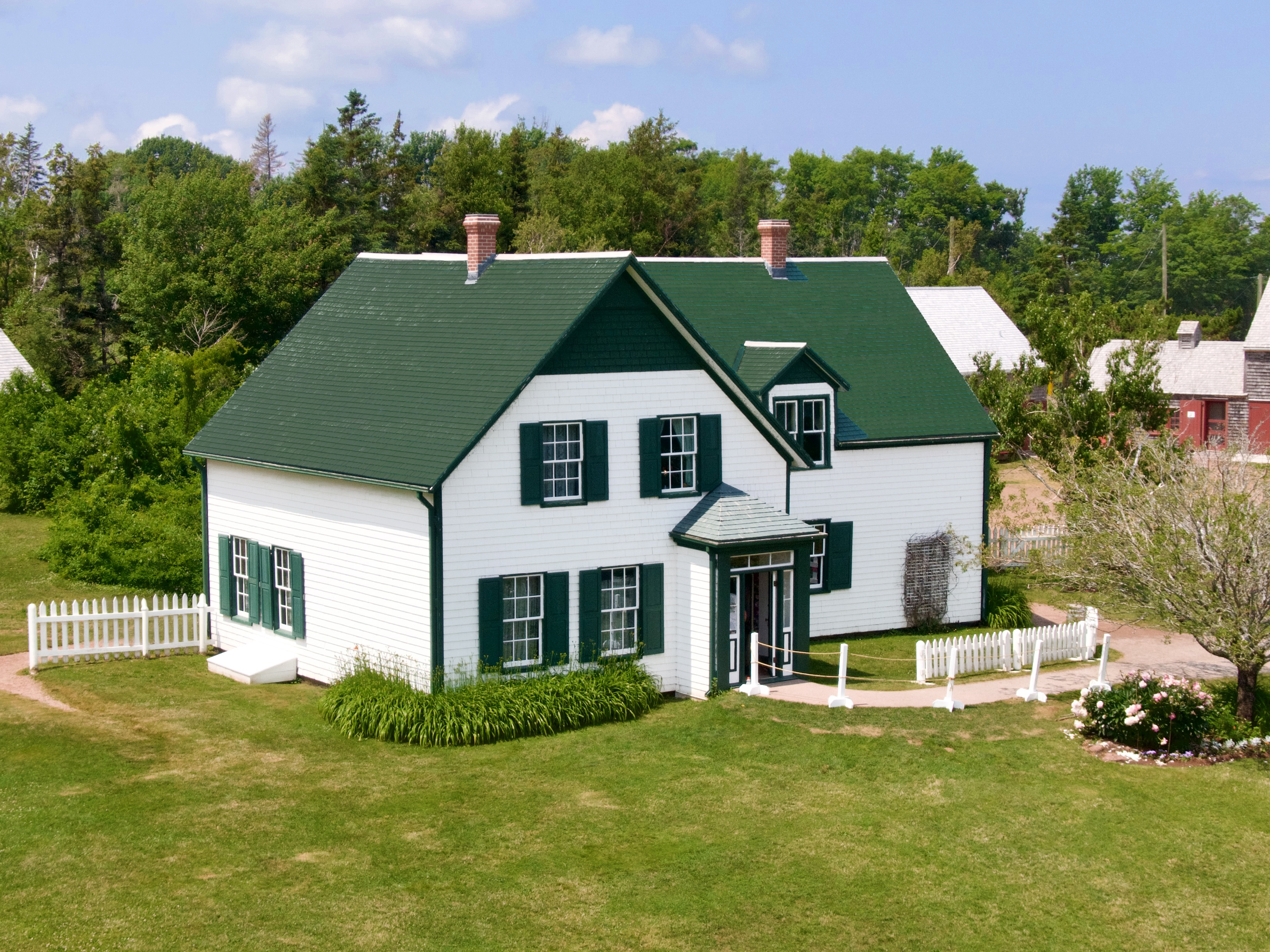
- Green Gables in 2025
- Interactive map of Green Gables Heritage Place
- Location: 8619 Cavendish Road, Cavendish, Prince Edward Island, Canada
- Coordinates: 46°29′16″N 63°22′55.4″W
- Area: 220 square metres (2,400 sq ft) (Note: The following figure is for the Green Gables House, not the property.)
- Built: 1830s–1870s (Note: The building was completed in stages from the 1830s to 1870s. Since its completion the building was expanded twice in 1921 and the 1970s.)
- Governing body: Parks Canada
- Website: www.pc.gc.ca/en/lhn-nhs/pe/greengables

Green Gables Heritage Place is a 19th-century farm and literary landmark in Cavendish, Prince Edward Island, Canada. Green Gables served as the setting for the Anne of Green Gables novels by Lucy Maud Montgomery. Green Gables is recognized as a Federal Historic Building by the government of Canada and is situated on the L.M. Montgomery's Cavendish National Historic Site of Canada. The National Historic Site itself is situated in Prince Edward Island National Park.

The building was initially erected during the 1830s, by the MacNeil family, relatives of Montgomery, who was born near the homestead. Interest in the Green Gables property grew in the decades after Montgomery published her novels, resulting in Green Gables' purchase by the government of Canada in 1936. The government initially operated the home as an historic house that depicted 19th-century farming life on Prince Edward Island. However, by the 1970s plans were undertaken to refurbish the building to resemble Green Gables as depicted in Montgomery's novels. Since 1985, Green Gables and the larger National Historic Site operate as a museum of Lucy Maud Montgomery and her novels.

== History ==
Green Gables was initially owned by the MacNeil family, relatives of Lucy Maud Montgomery, the author of Anne of Green Gables. The building was initially built by the family during the 1830s and was expanded during the 1870s and in 1921, the latter expansion resulting in the building's present L-shape.

In 1908, Montgomery published Anne of Green Gables, with Green Gables serving as the home for the titular character Anne Shirley. Interest in the home grew after the publication of Anne of Green Gables and the release of a movie based on the novels in 1934. With Green Gables vacant during the 1930s, the government of Canada purchased the property in 1936 as a part of a larger effort to develop Prince Edward Island National Park. In 1938, plans were made to develop Green Gables into a clubhouse for the adjacent golf course; but these plans were abandoned after public backlash against the proposal. After Montgomery's death in 1942, her body was transported from Ontario to Prince Edward Island, with a funeral ceremony held at Green Gables. Montgomery is interred in the Cavendish cemetery, adjacent to the Green Gables property.

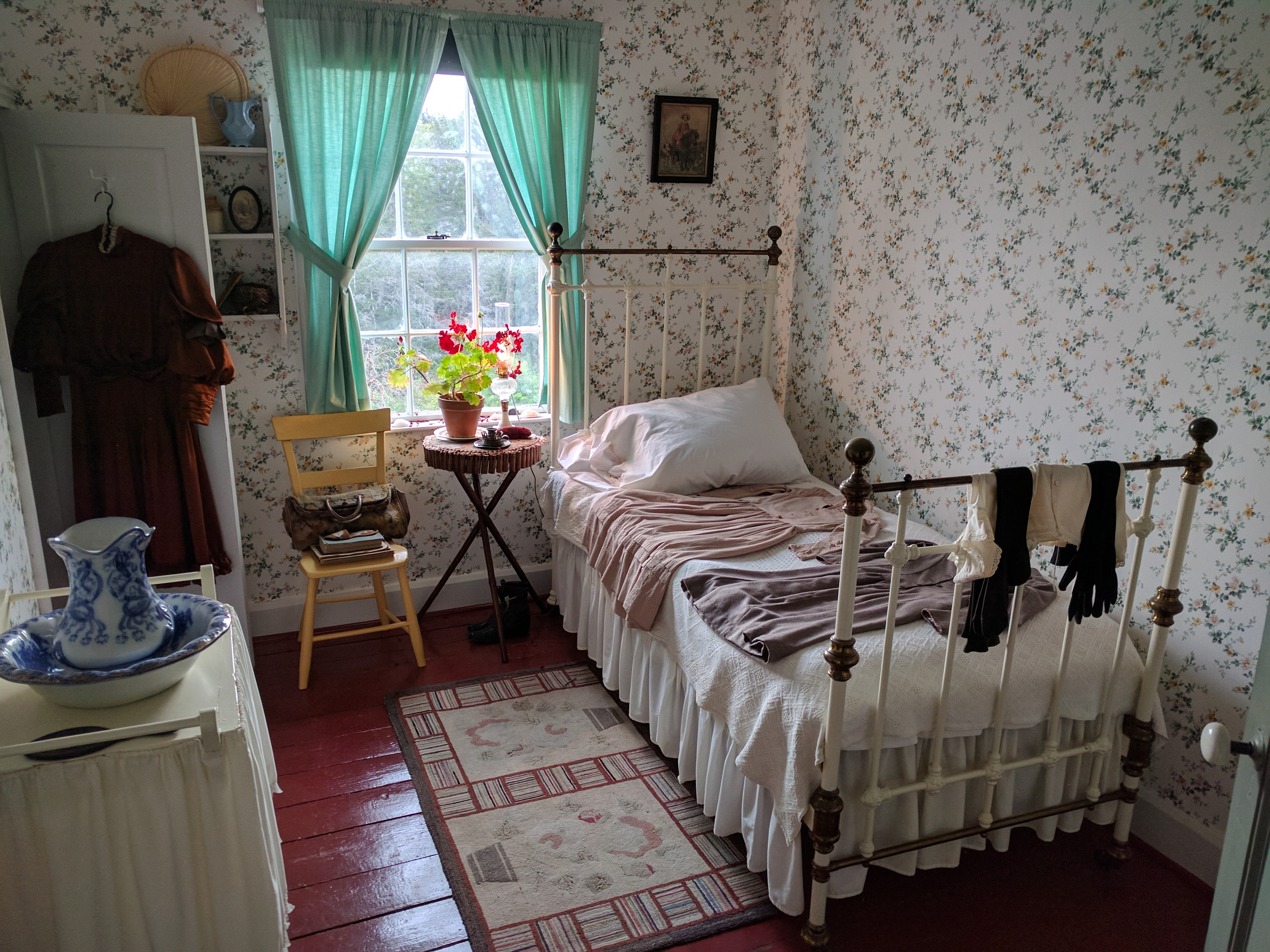
"Anne's Room," is one of several rooms in the farmhouse made to resemble the setting in Montgomery's novels

During the 1950s, the home was furnished with period-appropriate furniture and was used as a historic house. During the 1970s, the building was refurnished and remodelled to resemble the Green Gables depicted in Montgomery's novels. In the same decade, the building was expanded again; before it underwent significant restorations in 1985, after Parks Canada decided to switch the furnishing in the home to reflect how Green Gables was depicted in Montgomery's novels.

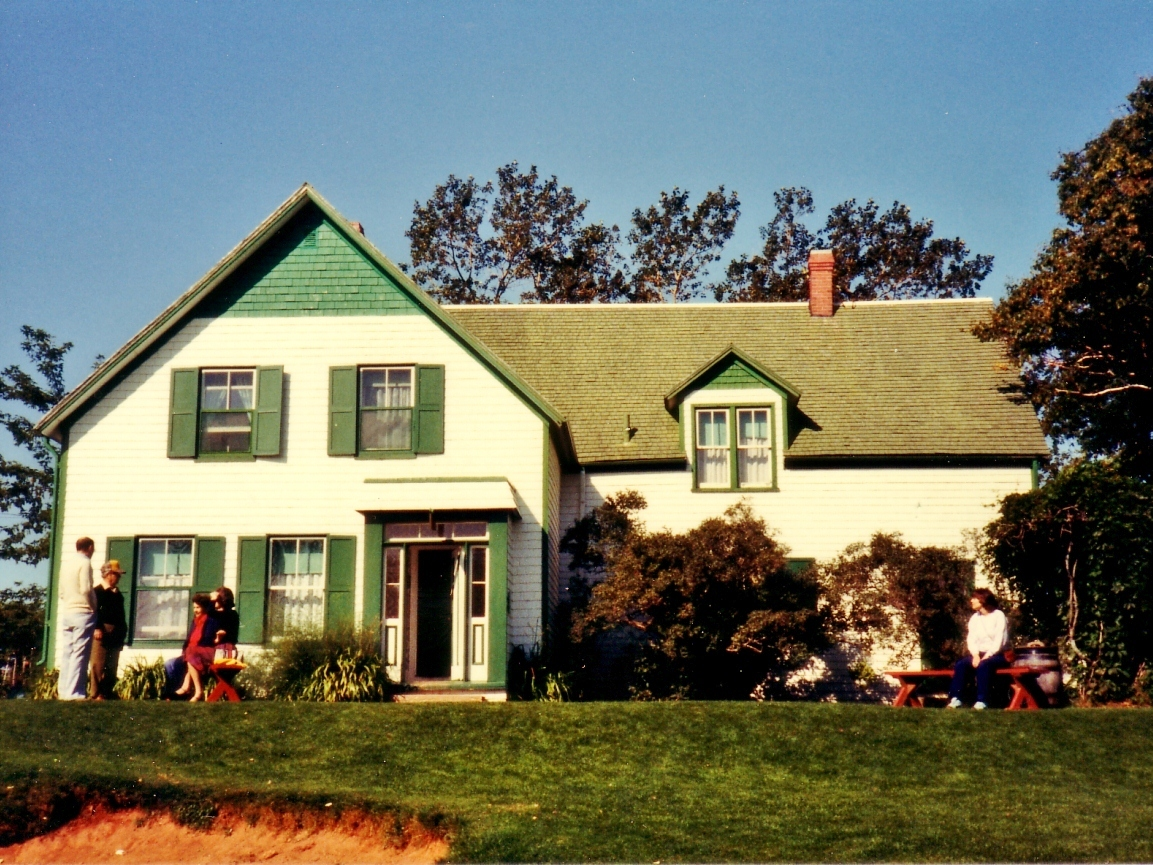
Green Gables in 1982

On 10 July 1985, Green Gables was officially designated as a Federal Heritage Building as an example of 19th century architecture in the province, and for the home's importance to the literary community. The larger property, including the ruins of Montgomery's homestead were designated as the L.M. Montgomery's Cavendish National Historic Site of Canada in 2004.

In 2017, the government unveiled a CA$9.5 million restoration plan to restore the Green Gables building, in addition to building a new interpretive centre. On 29 August 2019, an interpretive centre built north of the Green Gables homestead was opened to the public; with Hisako, Princess Takamado in attendance for the interpretive centre's grand opening. On 1 December 2020, Green Gables was awarded the Japanese Foreign Minister's commendation for their contributions to promotion of mutual understanding between Canada and Japan.

== Property ==
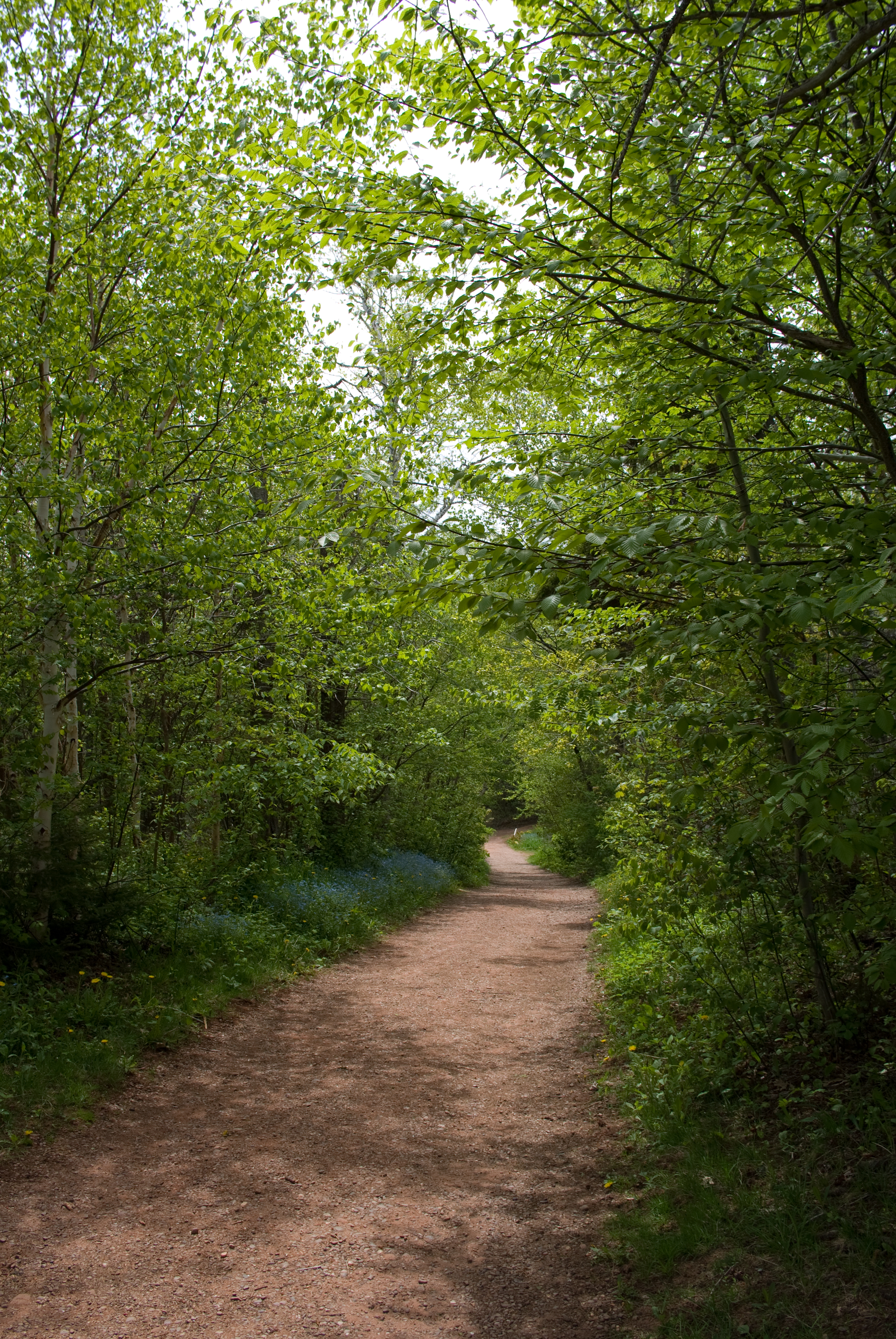
Lovers' Lane is one of several trails situated on the property that surrounds Green Gables

Green Gables is situated on the L.M. Montgomery's Cavendish National Historic Site of Canada, a large property that also includes Montgomery's homestead, greenspaces that served as inspiration for Montgomery's novel, and several trails including Haunted Woods, Lovers' Lane, and Balsam Hollow. The larger property was designated as a National Historic Site of Canada on 12 October 2004. The property itself is situated within Prince Edward Island National Park.

The National Historic Site is largely divided into two areas, Montgomery's home and Green Gables. The former served as the home for the author of Anne of Green Gables and consists of the ruins of her home and other farm buildings from the late-19th century. Green Gables is situated to the west of Montgomery's home; with the lands surrounding Green Gables also including a historic schoolhouse, farm buildings, and trails. In 2019, an interpretive centre built north of Green Gables was opened to the public, and houses exhibitions on Montgomery and her novels, particularly Anne of Green Gables. Designed by Root Architecture, the centre includes exhibition spaces, gift shop, and offices. The interpretive centre surrounds a courtyard. Timber framing and panels is used throughout the interpretive centre.

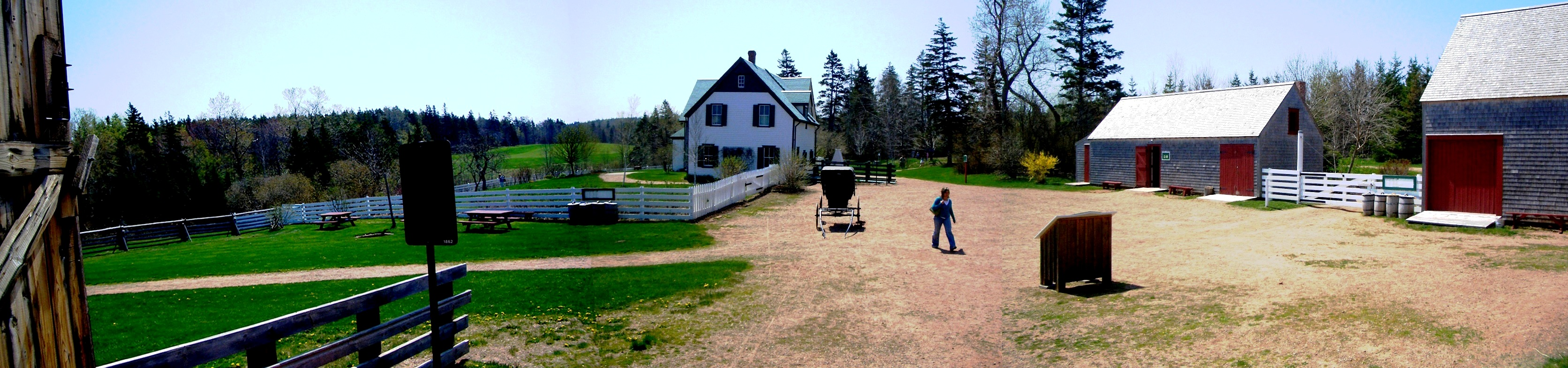
The Green Gables Home is situated on a larger National Historic Site that includes several other historic buildings

=== Green Gables ===
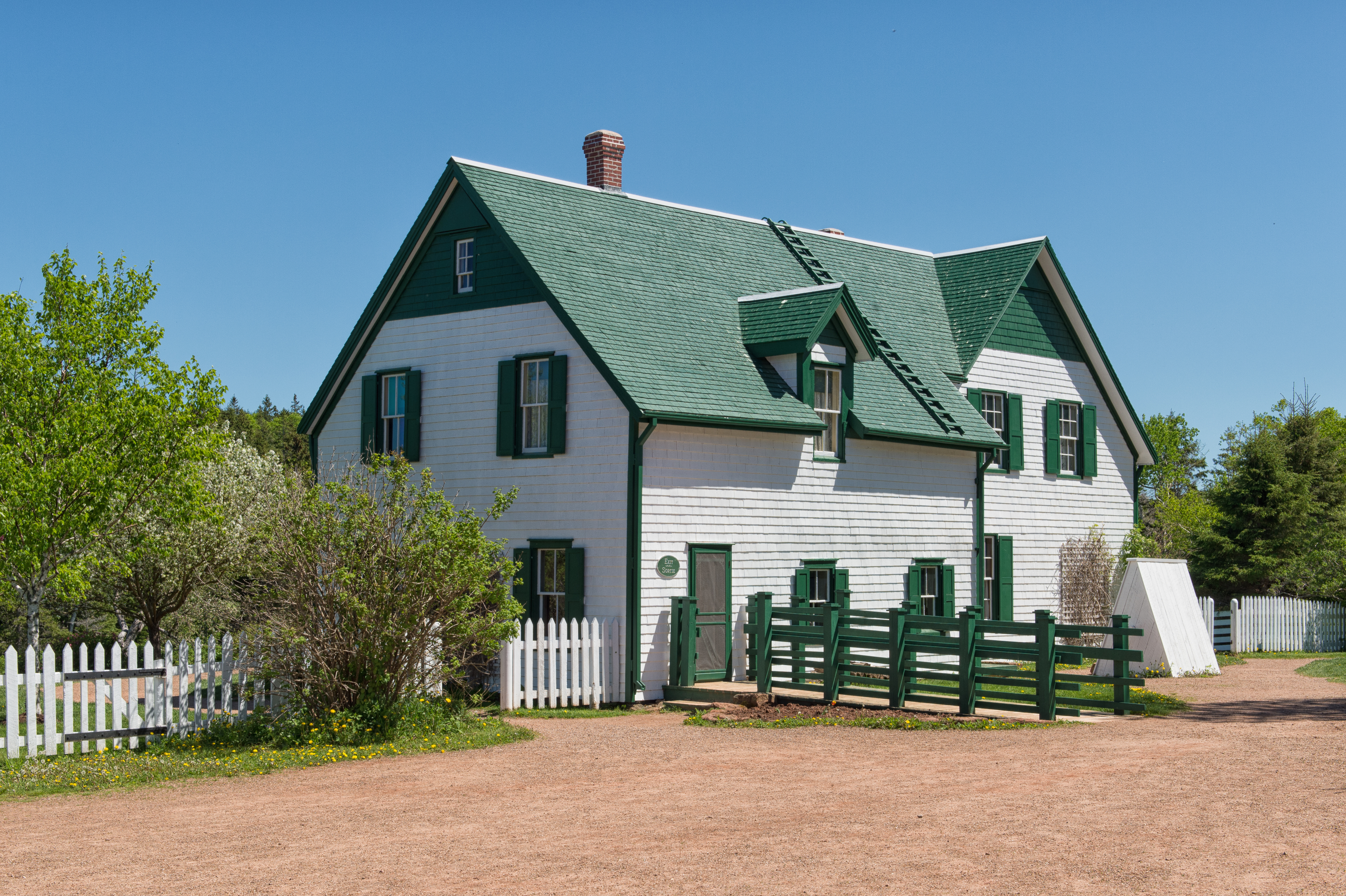
White-painted shingles are used throughout the building, with green being the only other major colour found on the building's exterior.

Green Gables is a 1 1/2-storey L-shaped home clad in white-painted shingles throughout; with the only other colour present on the building being the green-gabled rooftop and its window shutters. The green gable and shutters were painted onto the building shortly after the federal government purchased it in 1936, in an effort to make the building more "suitable," for its opening. There are six windows on the two floors of the building, each with shutters. The 220-square-metre-building (2,400 sq ft) includes five bedrooms, a dining room, sewing room, and a parlour. Although wood is used throughout the home, the building's chimneys are made of brick.

== See also ==
- List of museums in Prince Edward Island
- List of National Historic Sites of Canada in Prince Edward Island
