= Rusticoville, Prince Edward Island =

Rusticoville
- Unincorporated Rural Area
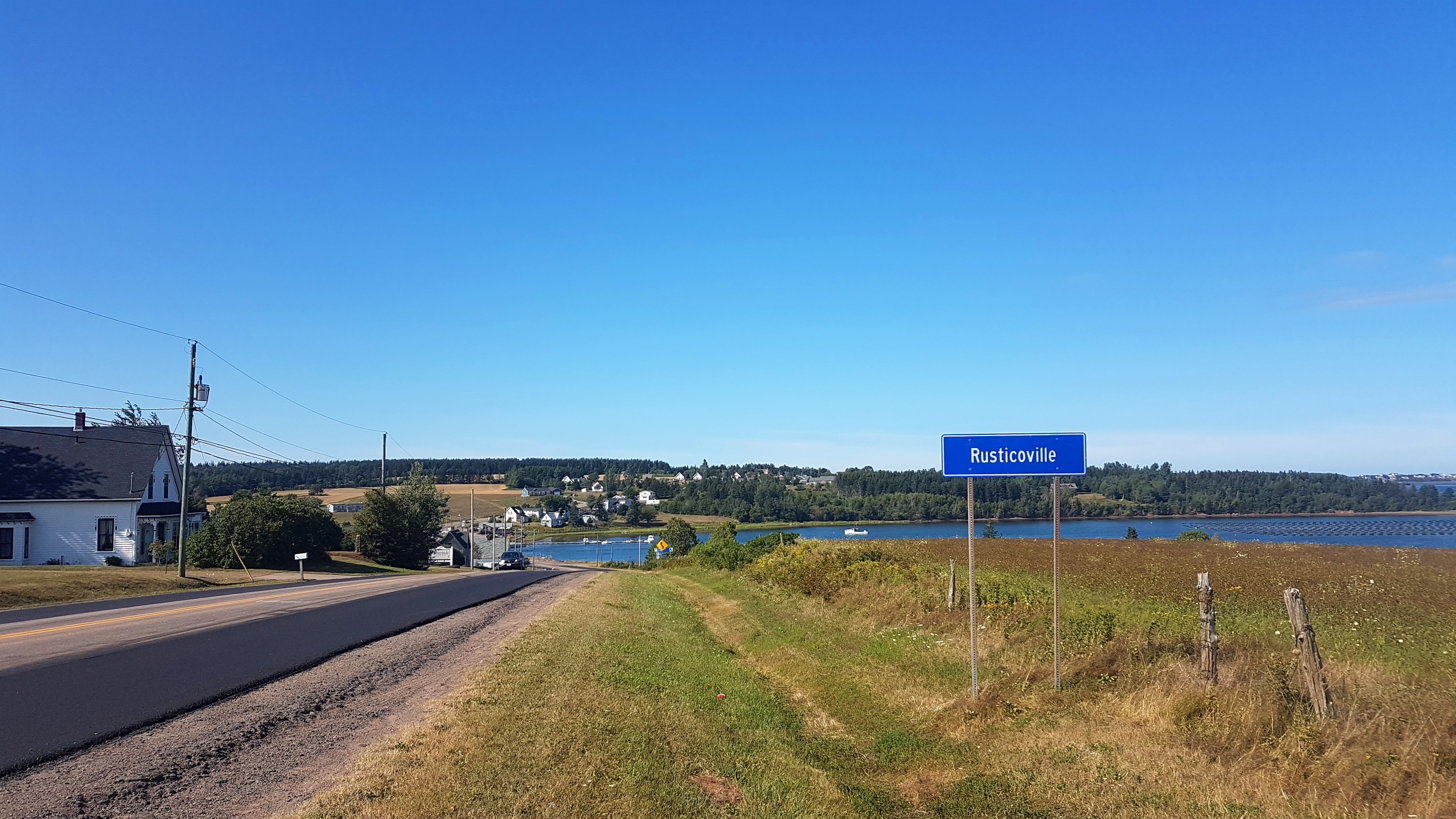
- Rusticoville in 2020

- Rusticoville
- Coordinates: 46.432721°N 63.318901°W
- Country: Canada
- Province: Prince Edward Island
- County: Queens County
- Parish: Greensville
- Lot: Lot 23
- Time zone: Atlantic (AST)
- Canadian Postal code: C0A 1N0
- Area code: 902 (963 exchange)
- NTS Map: 011L06
- GNBC Code: BACFD

Rusticoville is an unincorporated rural community in the township of Lot 23, Queens County, Prince Edward Island, Canada.

Rusticoville is located south of North Rustico and in the central part of the province on the north shore, fronting the Gulf of St. Lawrence.
