= Cavendish Beach =

Beach in Prince Edward Island, Canada

Coordinates: 46°30′0″N 63°26′0″W

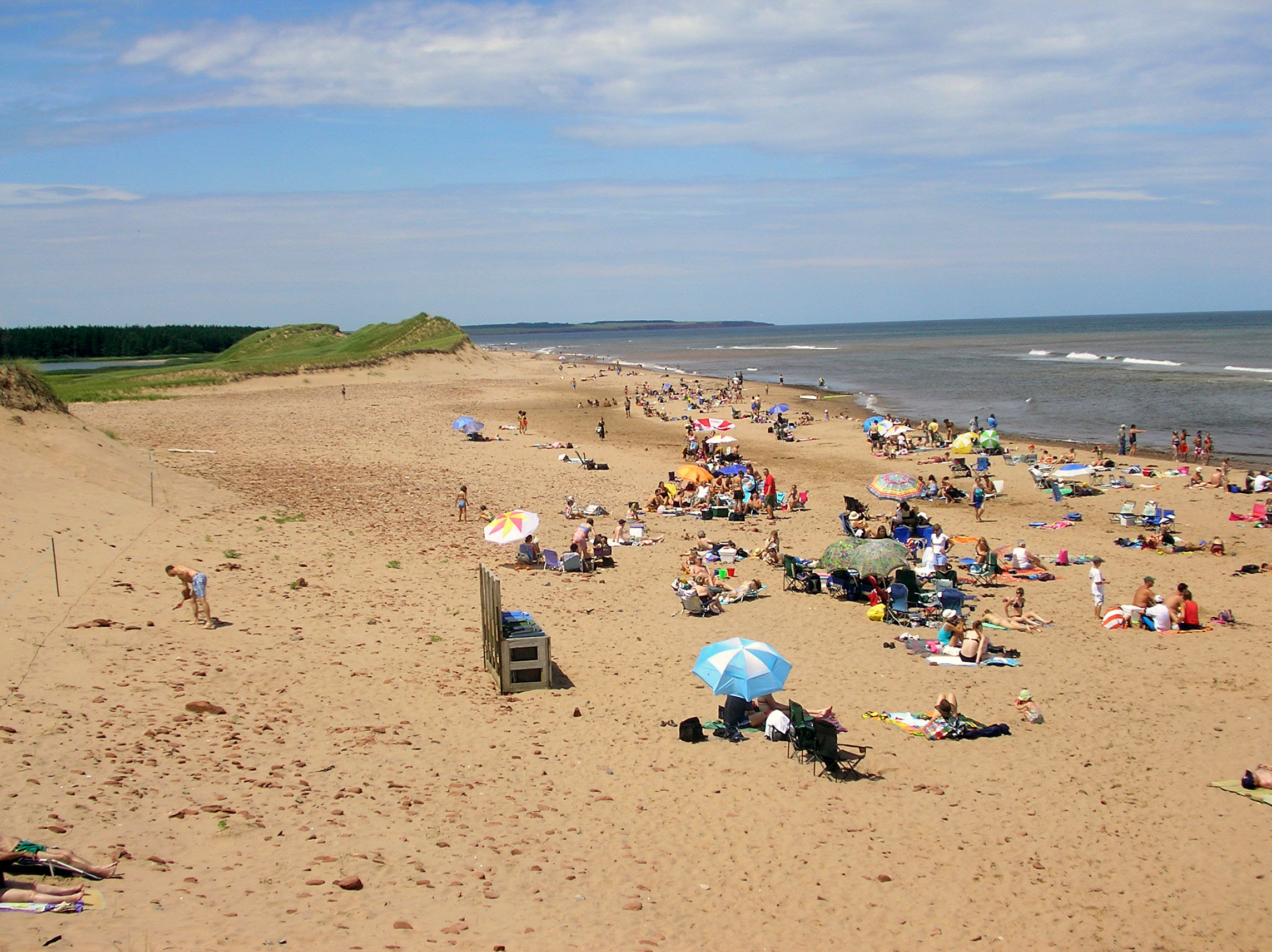
Cavendish Beach

Cavendish Beach is a beach in the community of Cavendish, Prince Edward Island, Canada.

Fronting the Gulf of St. Lawrence, this broad natural sand beach stretches for 8 kilometres from the entrance to New London Bay in the west, to the red sandstone cliffs at Cavendish East in the east. The entire beach is located in the Prince Edward Island National Park.

The beach is typically divided into the following sections:

- Cavendish Spit, a barrier beach protecting the entrance to New London Bay.
- Cavendish Campground Beach, the section of Cavendish Beach near the national park campground, immediately east of the spit.
- Cavendish Main Beach, the most publicly accessible area of beach at the end of Graham's Lane. It has extensive parking facilities, as well as a complex featuring changing rooms, washrooms and a canteen. A boardwalk carries beach goers over the fragile sand dunes fringing the edge of the beach and separating it from MacNeill's Pond in the southeast and Clark's Pond in the southwest.

== Gallery ==
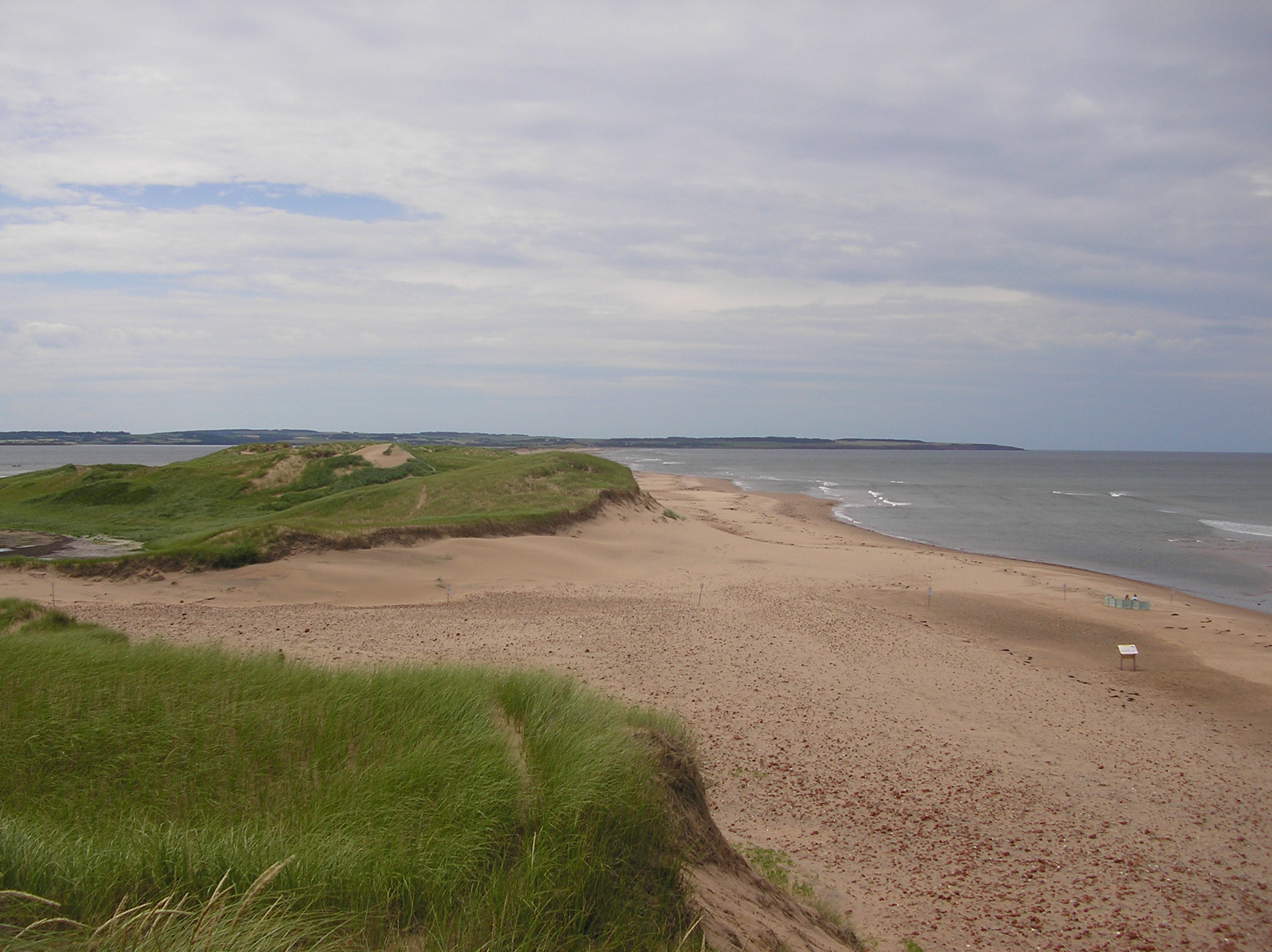
Cavendish Spit

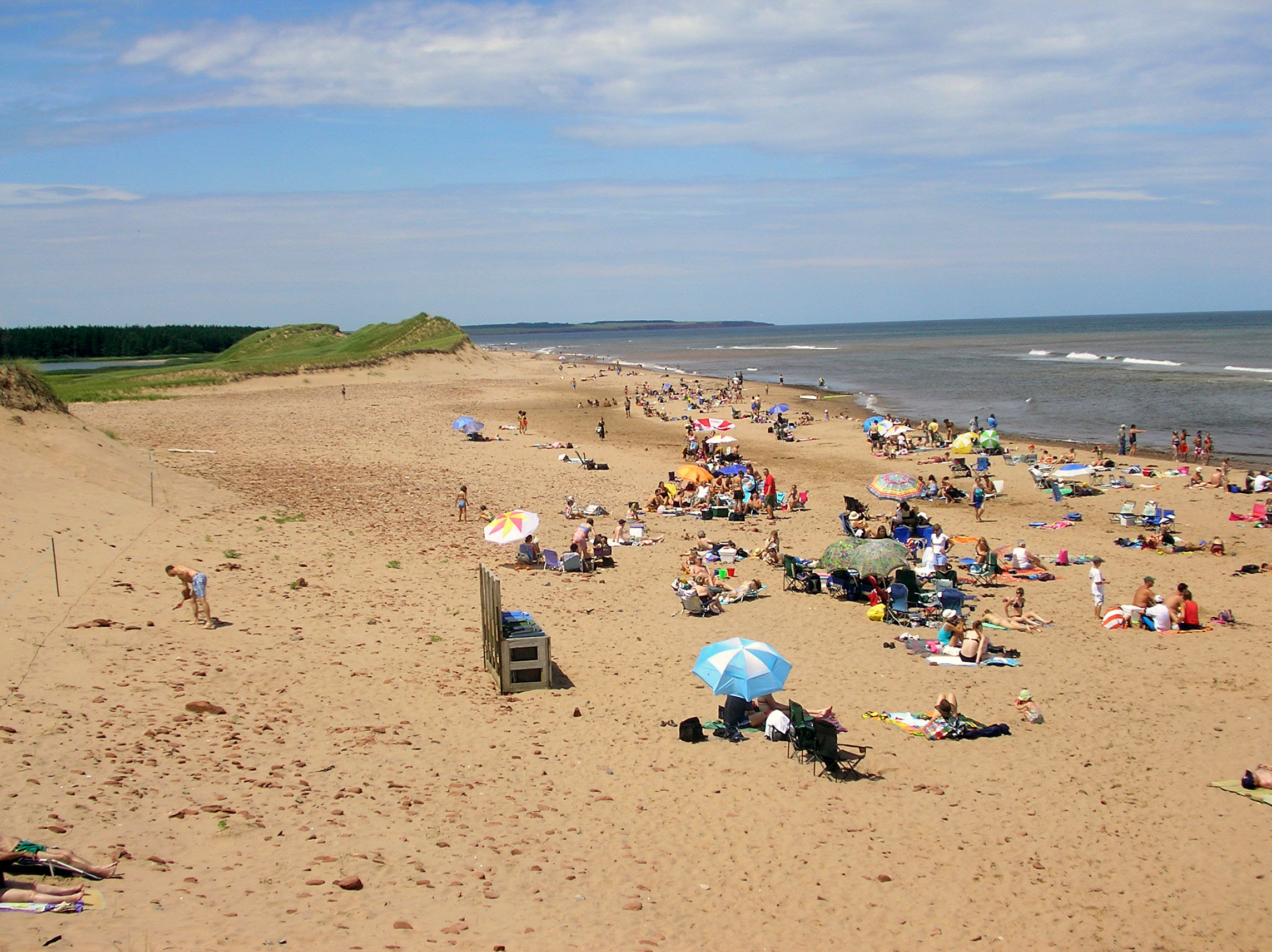
Cavendish beach looking towards New London Bay

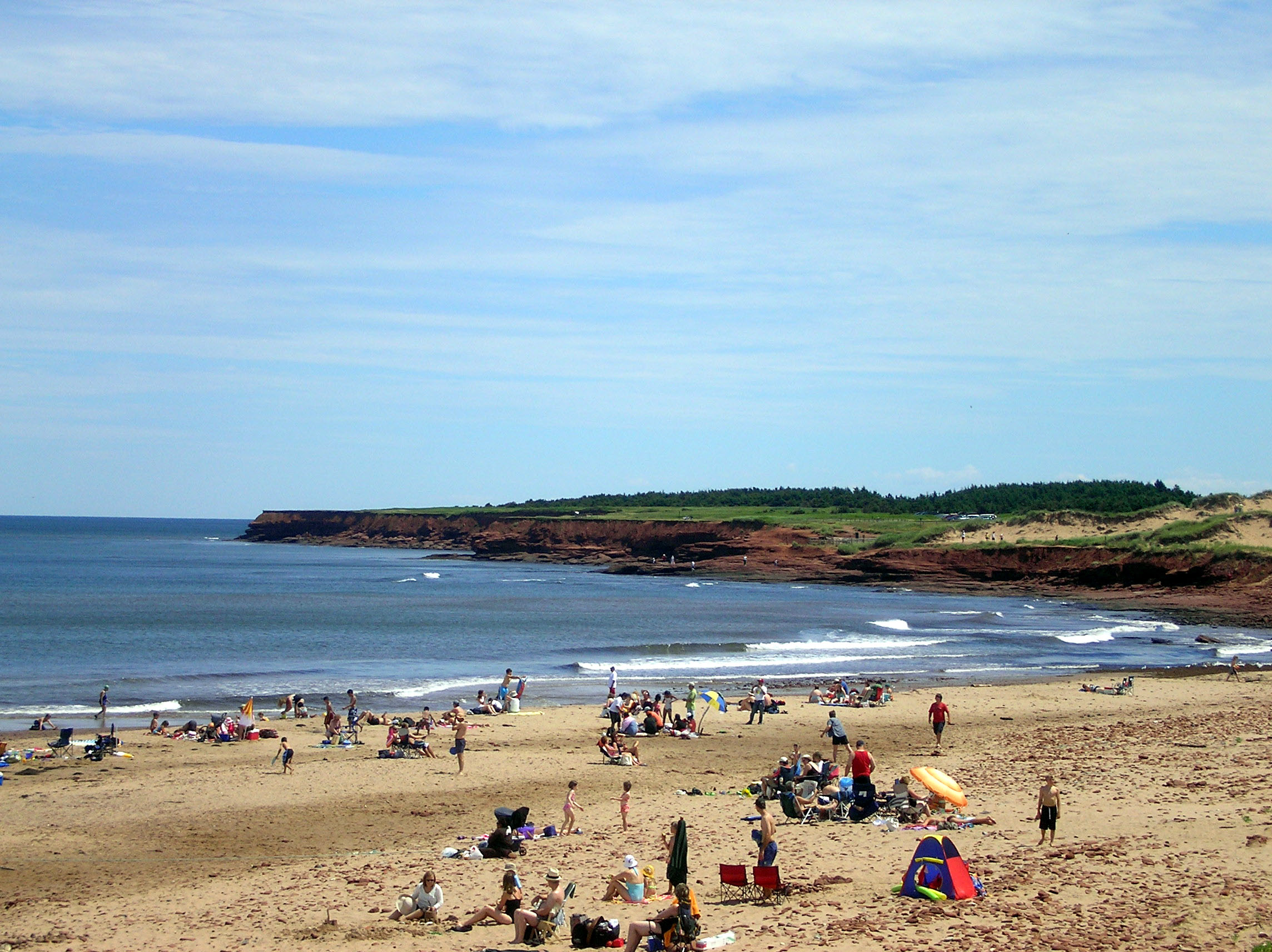
Cavendish looking towards North Rustico

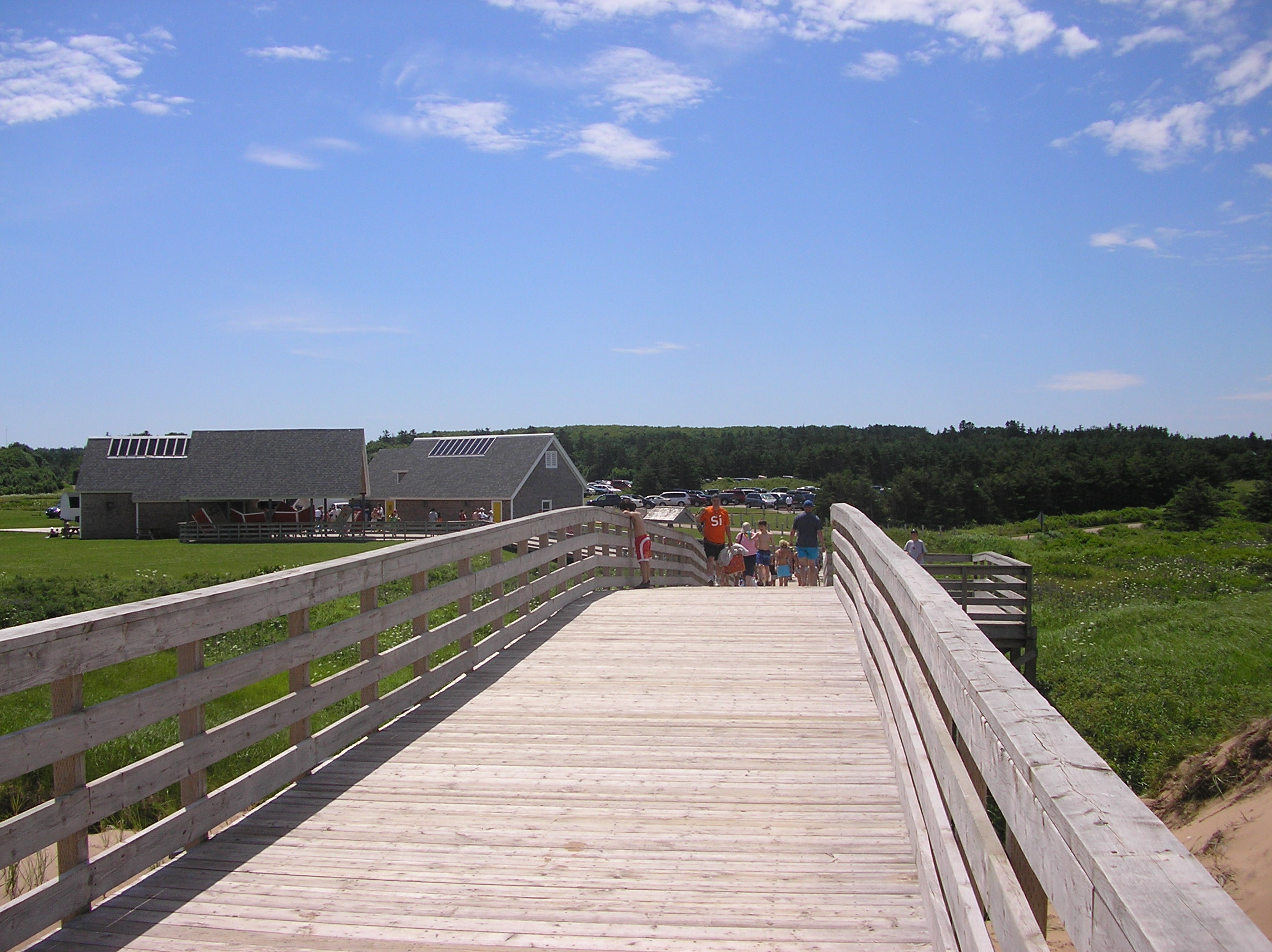
Boardwalk leading from main entrance to beach

Piping plover nesting area

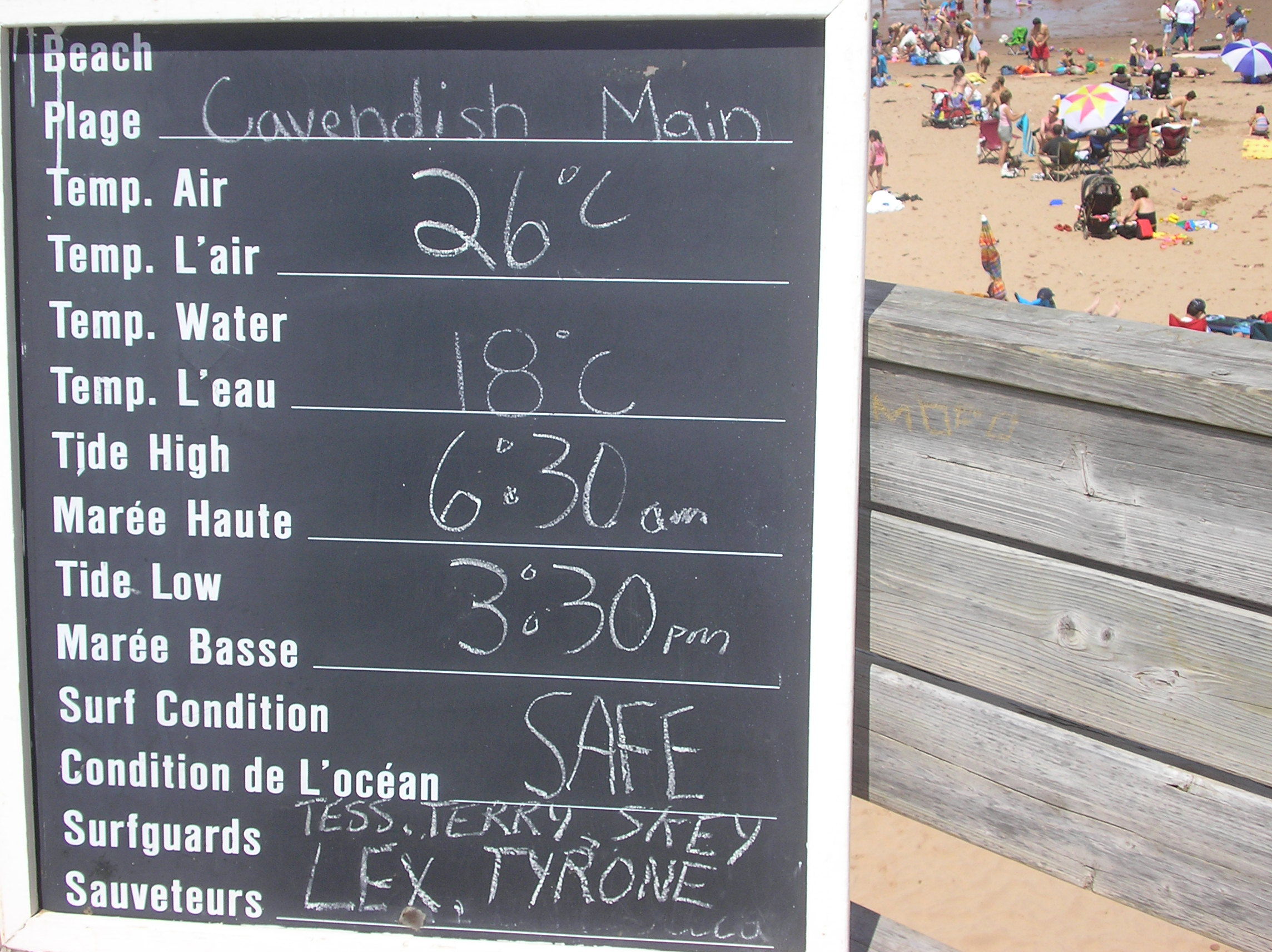
Board with daily conditions at main entrance to beach

Board with daily conditions at campground entrance to beach
