= Toronto, Prince Edward Island =

Coordinates: 46°27′N 63°23′W

Toronto in Prince Edward Island

Toronto is an unincorporated area and civic address community in Queens County, Prince Edward Island, Canada. It is part of Lot 23 in Grenville Parish. It lies 4 miles (6.4 km) southwest of North Rustico on Route 241.

== History ==
The settlement, originally named Martin, had a post office from 1891 to 1914 with Moses Martin as the first postmaster. The settlement was renamed "Toronto" after the city in Ontario in 1966 and became a civic address community in 2000.

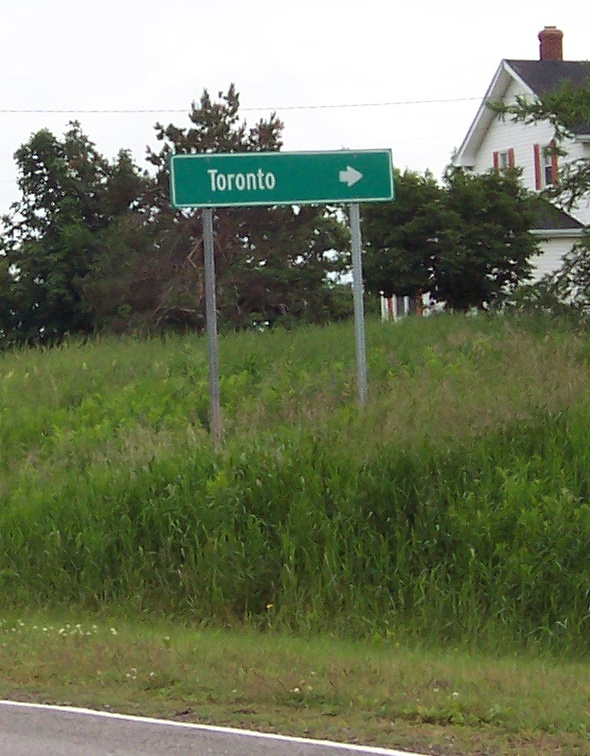
Direction sign for Toronto on Route 13 in Mayfield

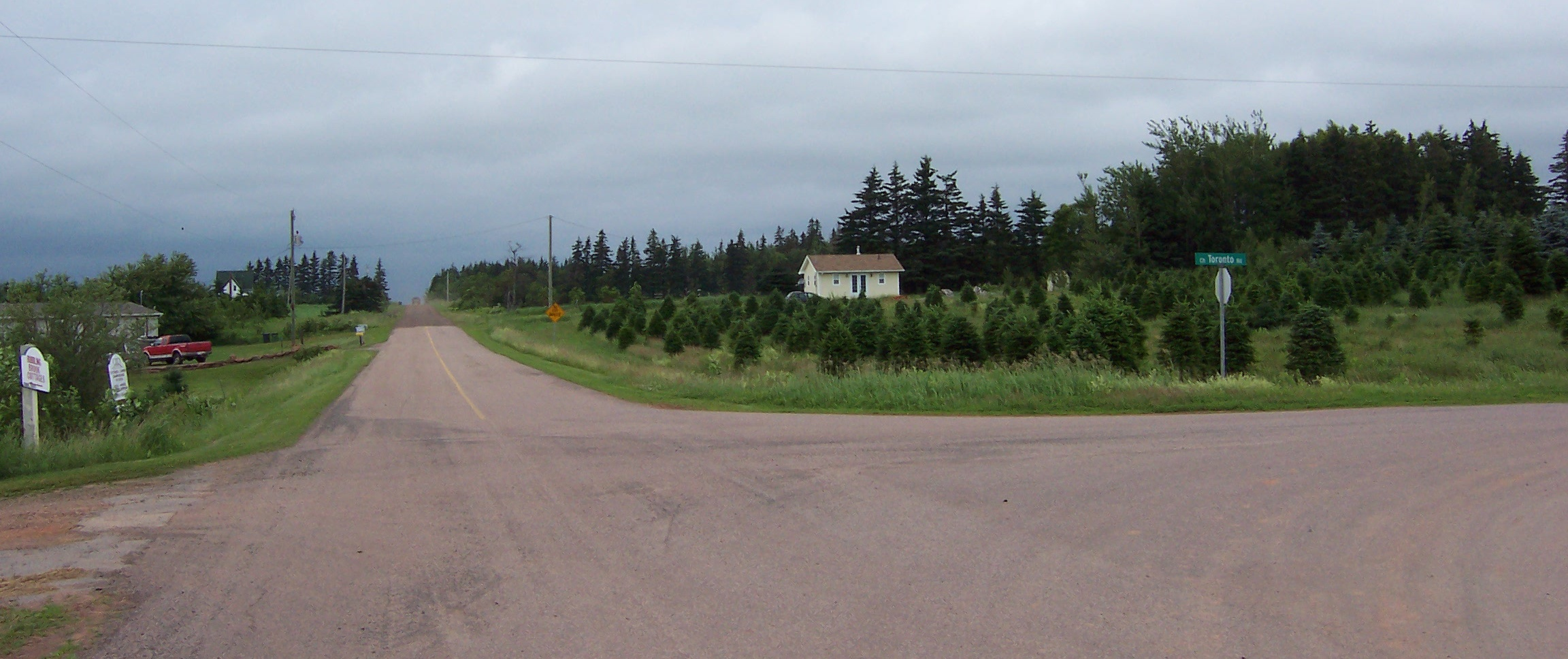
Toronto
