= Prince Edward Island National Park =

National park on Prince Edward Island, Canada

- Parc national de l'Île-du-Prince-Édouard
- IUCN category II (national park)
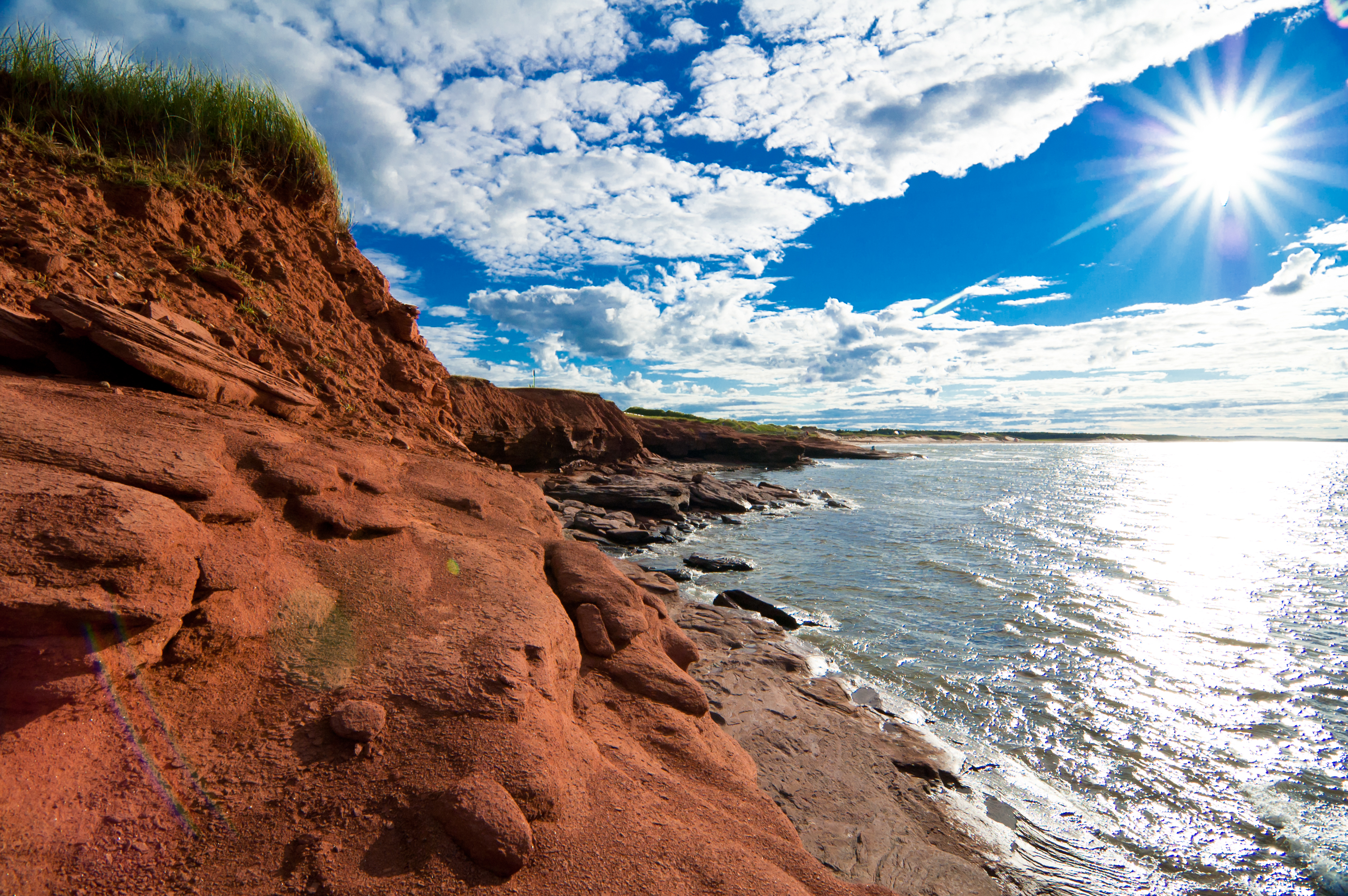

- Location within Canada Location within Prince Edward Island
- Interactive map of Prince Edward Island National Park
- Location: Prince Edward Island, Canada
- Nearest city: Charlottetown
- Coordinates: 46°25′00″N 63°04′30″W
- Area: 27 km^{2} (10 sq mi)
- Established: 1937
- Governing body: Parks Canada

Prince Edward Island National Park (French: Parc national de l'Île-du-Prince-Édouard) is a National Park of Canada located in the province of Prince Edward Island. Situated along the island's north shore, fronting the Gulf of St. Lawrence, the park measures approximately 60 km (37 mi) in length and ranges from several hundred metres to several kilometres in width. Established in 1937, the park's mandate includes the protection of many broad sand beaches, sand dunes and both freshwater wetlands and saltmarshes. The park's protected beaches provide nesting habitat for the endangered piping plover; the park has been designated a Canadian Important Bird Area.

An extension was added to the park in 1998 when an extensive sand dune system in Greenwich was transferred from the provincial government to Parks Canada. The Prince Edward Island National Park also includes Green Gables, a 19th century farm that was the childhood inspiration for the Anne of Green Gables novels by author Lucy Maud Montgomery, as well as Dalvay-by-the-Sea, a Victorian era mansion currently operated as an inn.

In 1999, the Canadian Nature Federation identified Prince Edward Island National Park as being the most endangered in the national park system, based on human impact. The park also experiences severe coastal erosion as a result of winter storms and its vulnerable shoreline.

The park was the subject of a short film in 2011's National Parks Project, directed by John Walker and scored by Chad Ross, Sophie Trudeau and Dale Morningstar. Part of the Jezero crater on Mars was informally named after the park.

== Wildlife ==
Animals that inhabit this national park are coyotes, red foxes, raccoons, beavers, mink, and weasels. Numerous birds roam in this park including species of various herons, ducks, owls, cranes, plovers, grouse, jays, falcons, geese, hawks, sandpipers and eagles.

== Gallery ==
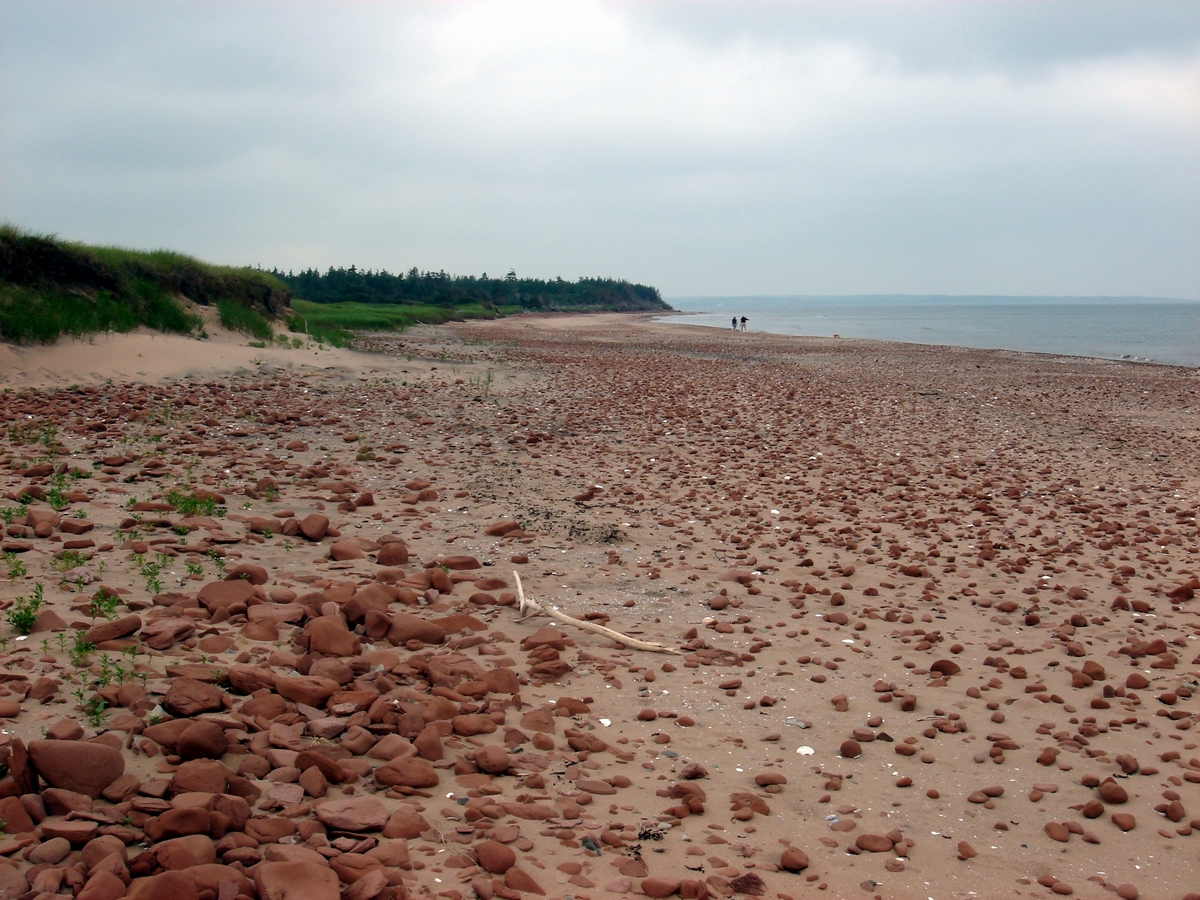
Red sand beach in PEI National Park

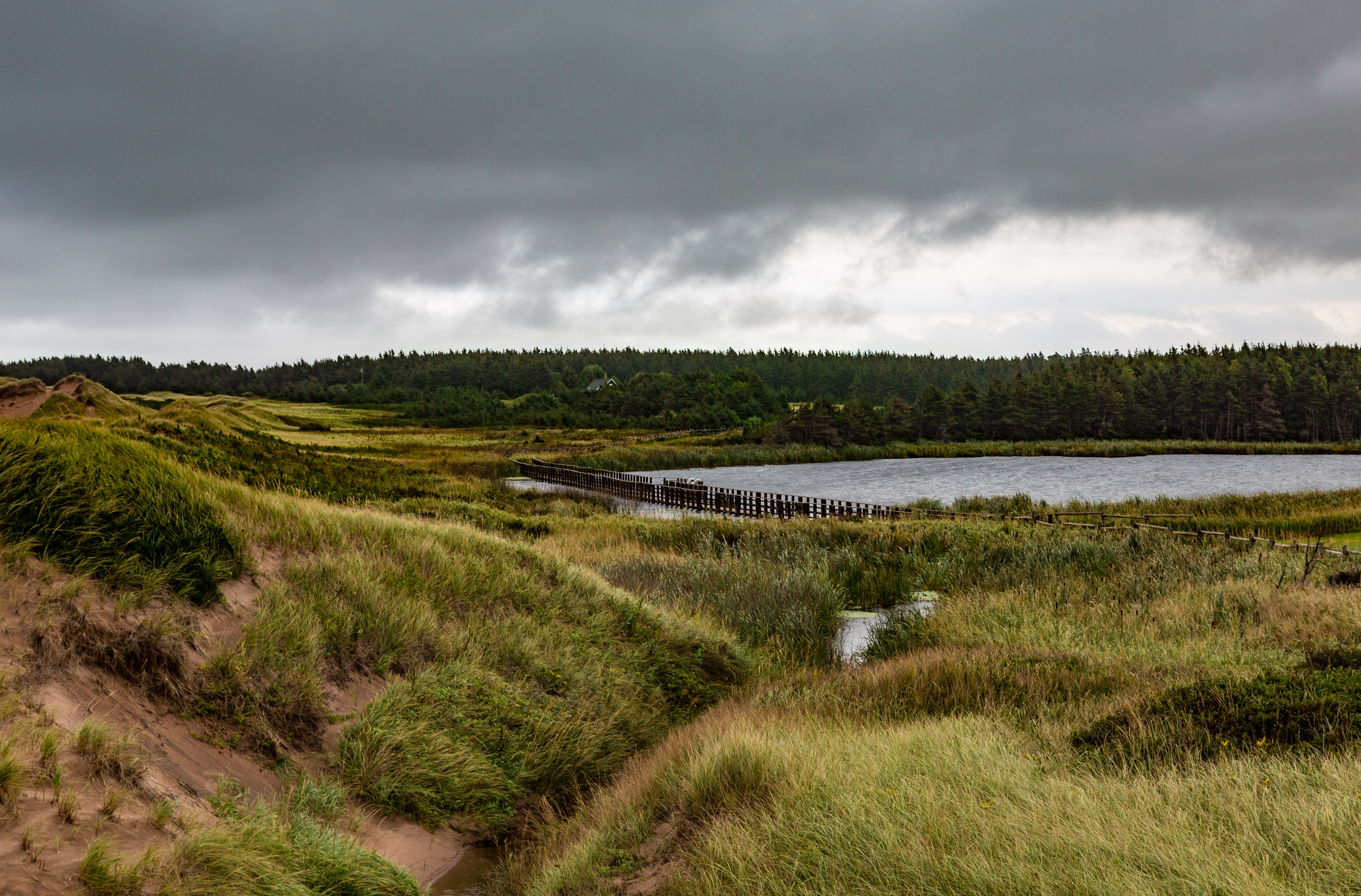
Lake of Shining Waters

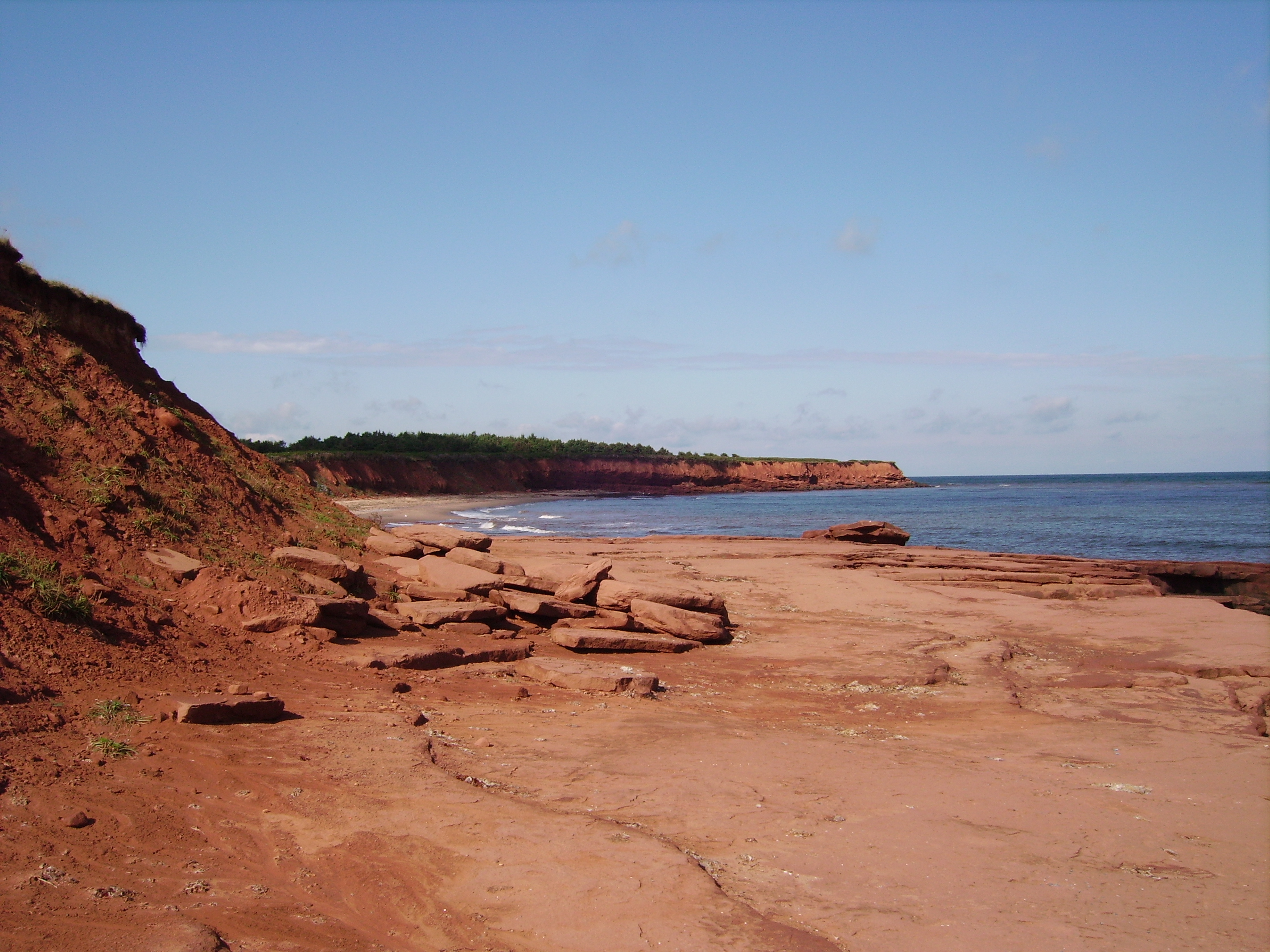
Coast of Prince Edward Island

Restricted area for nesting piping plover

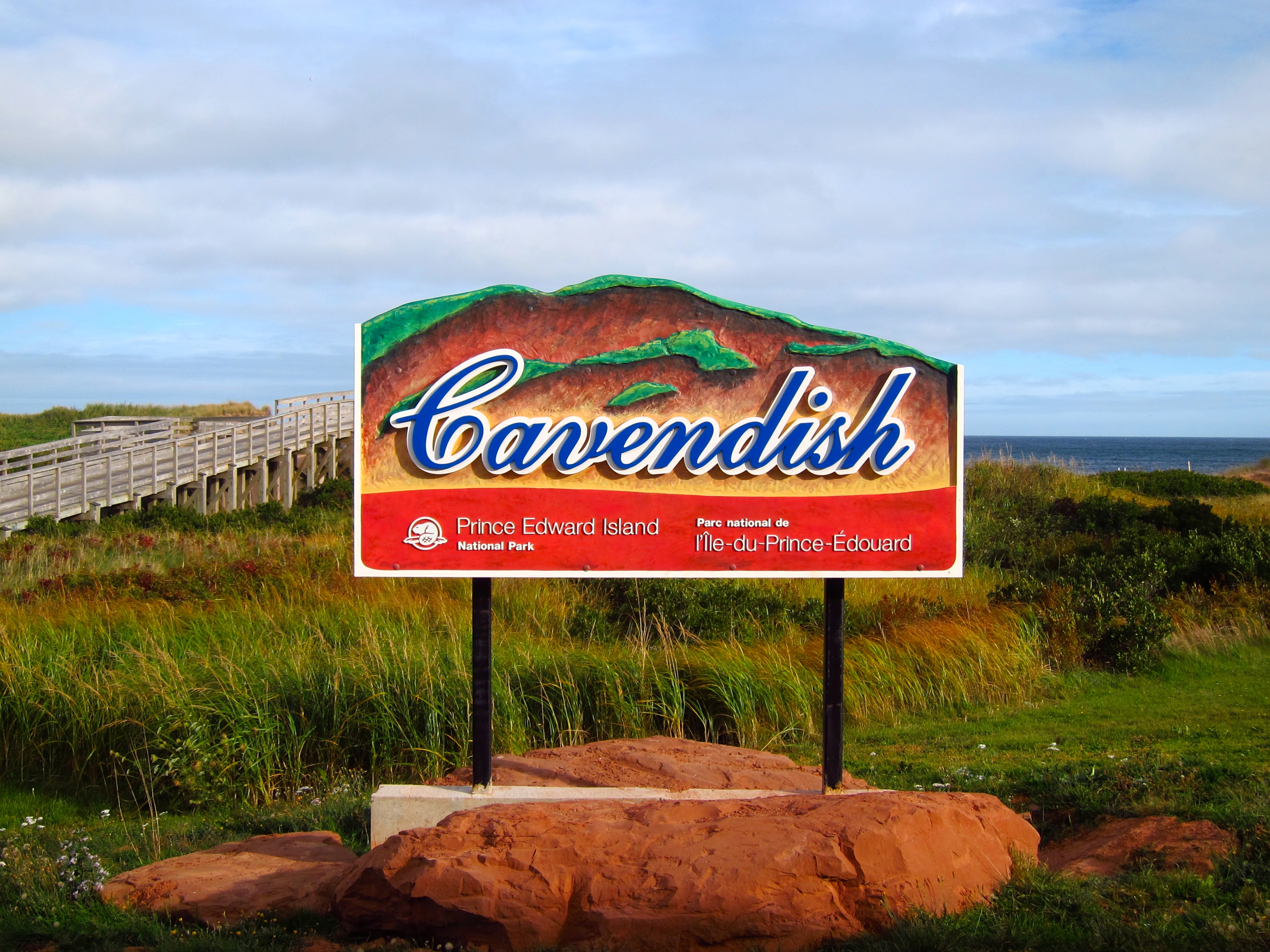
Prince Edward Island National Park on Cavendish Beach

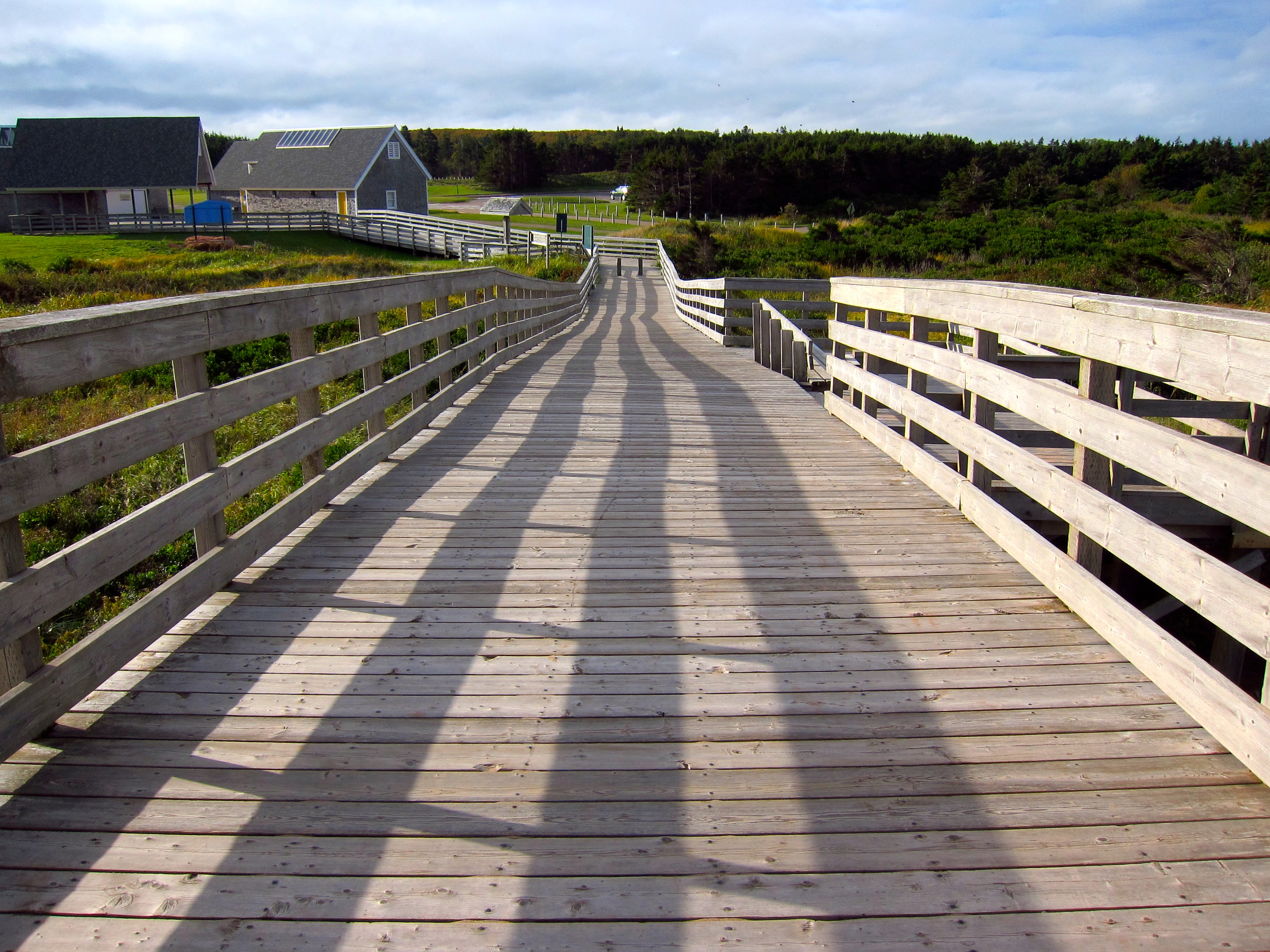
Pedestrian walk

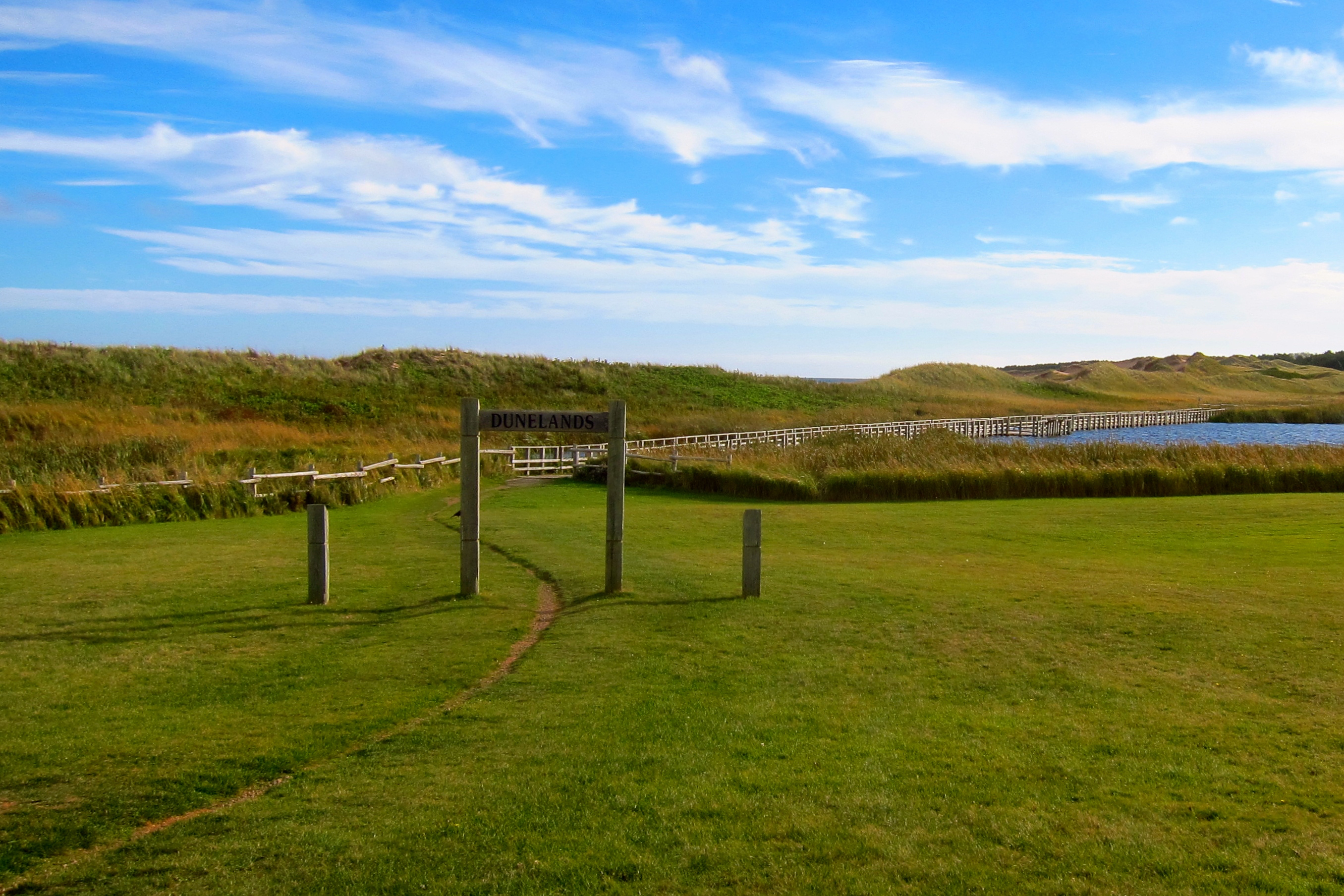
Grassland

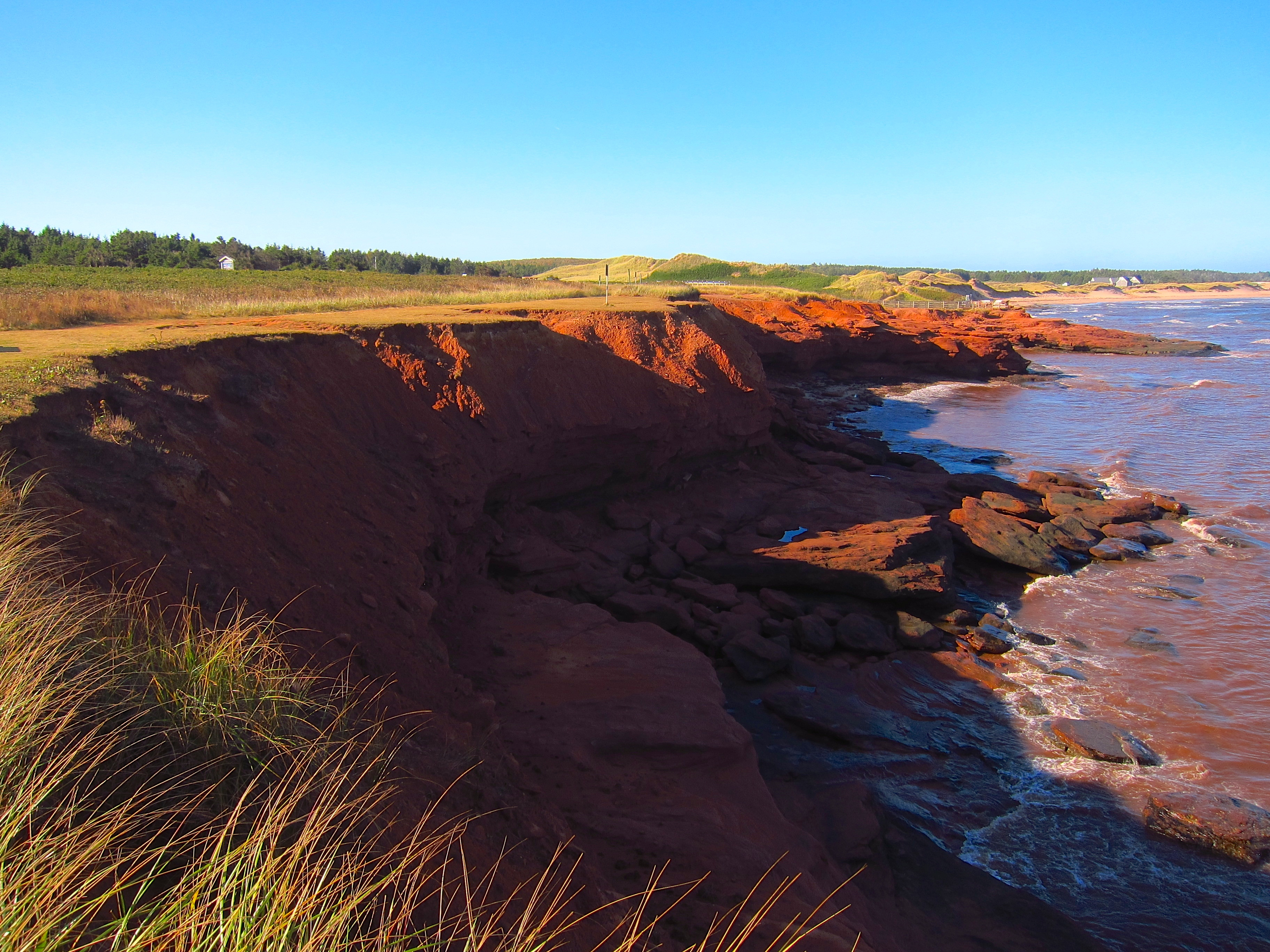
Prince Edward Island National Park's coast

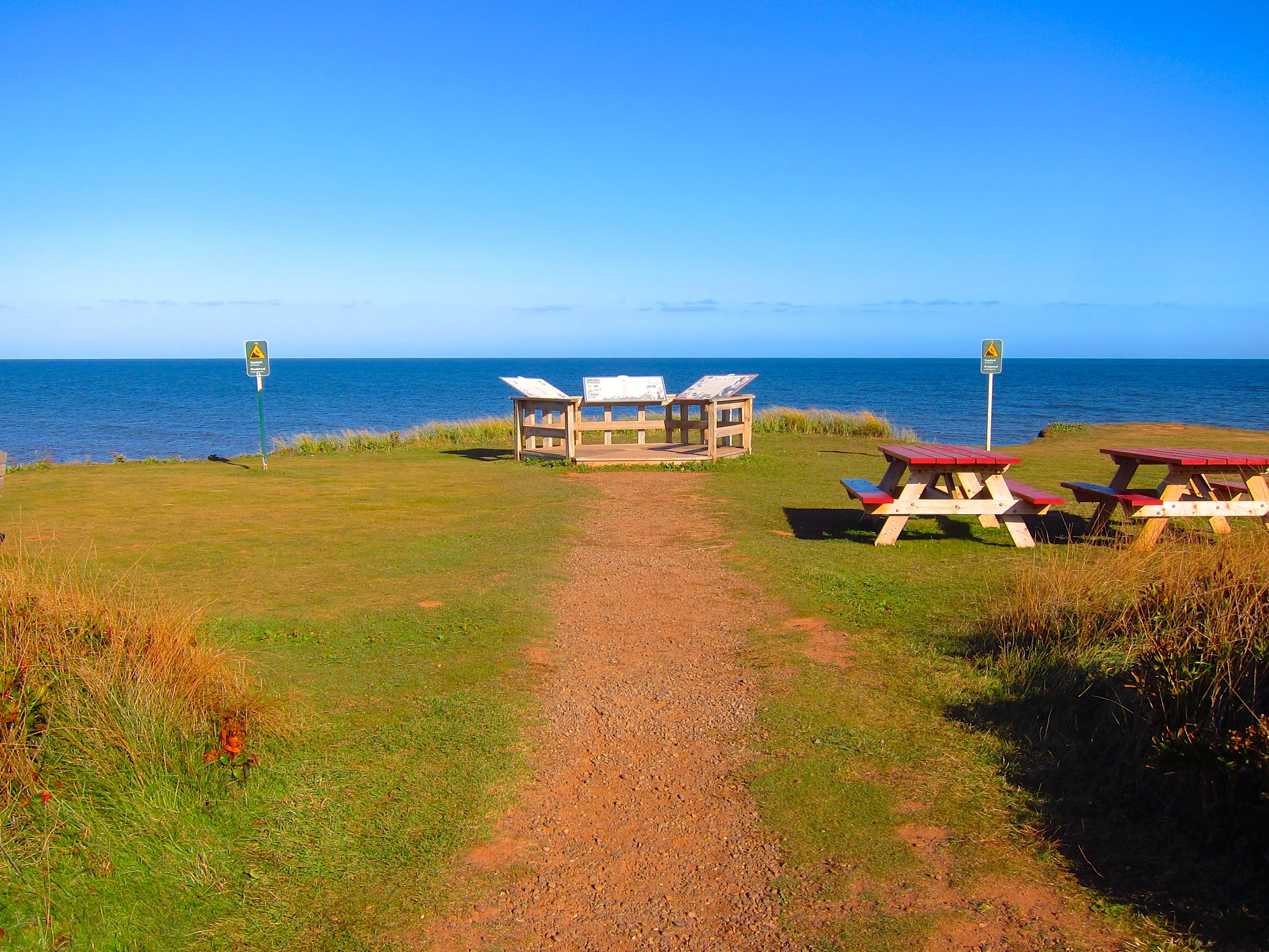
Orientation table

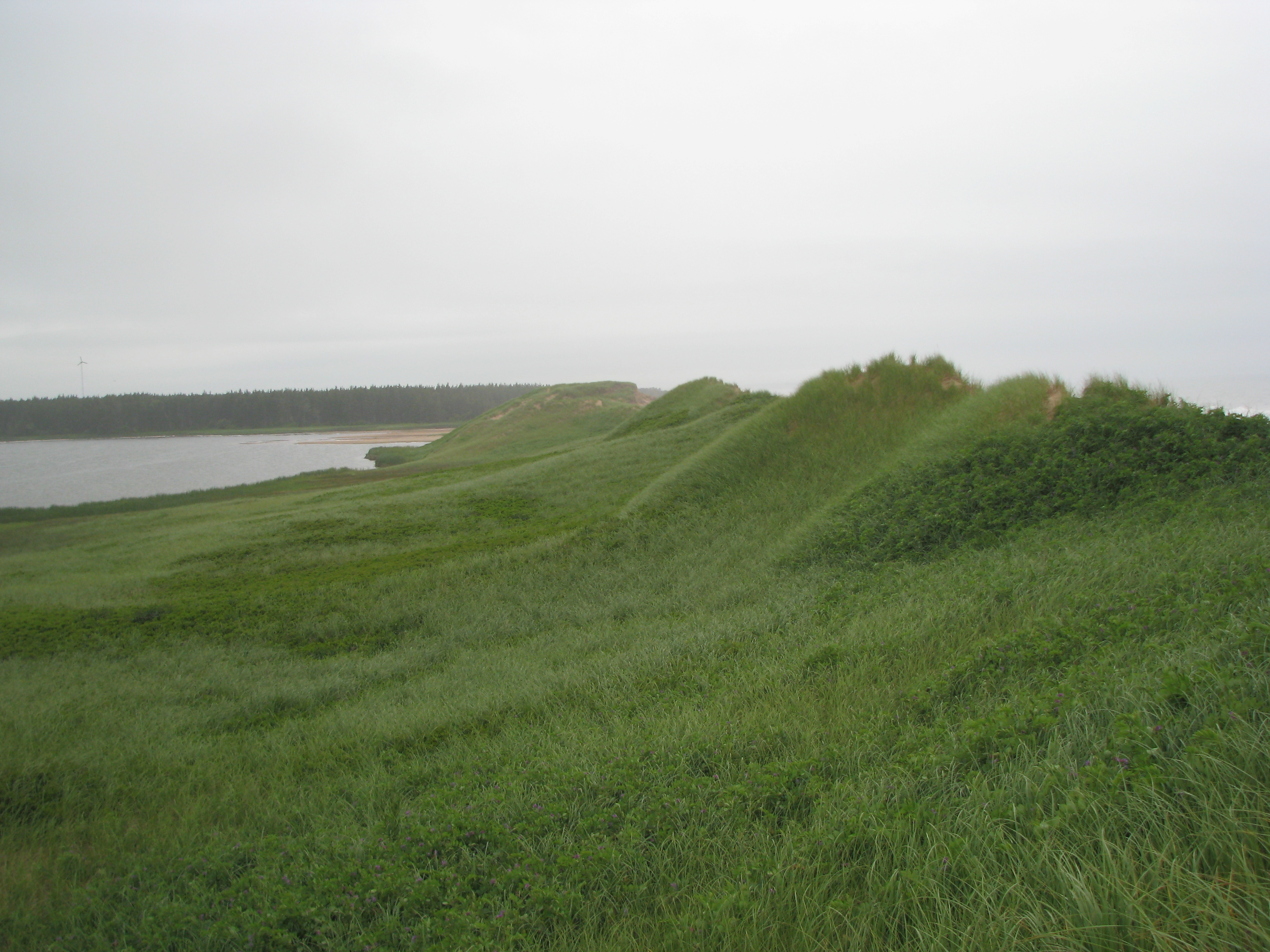
Dunes at Cavendish Beach

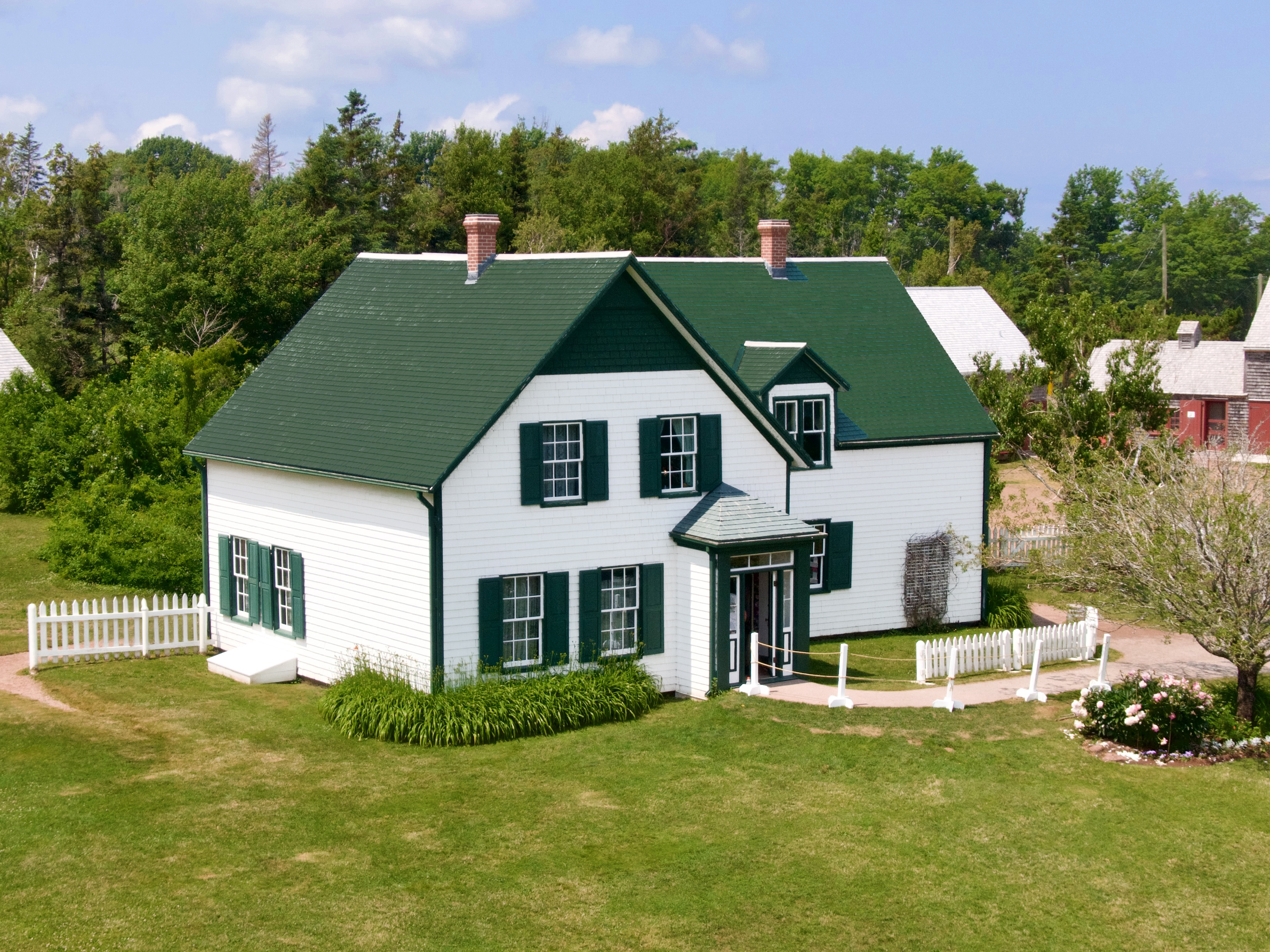
Green Gables

== See also ==
- National parks of Canada
- List of national parks of Canada
- List of parks in Prince Edward Island
