= Greenwich, Prince Edward Island =

Community in Prince Edward Island, Canada

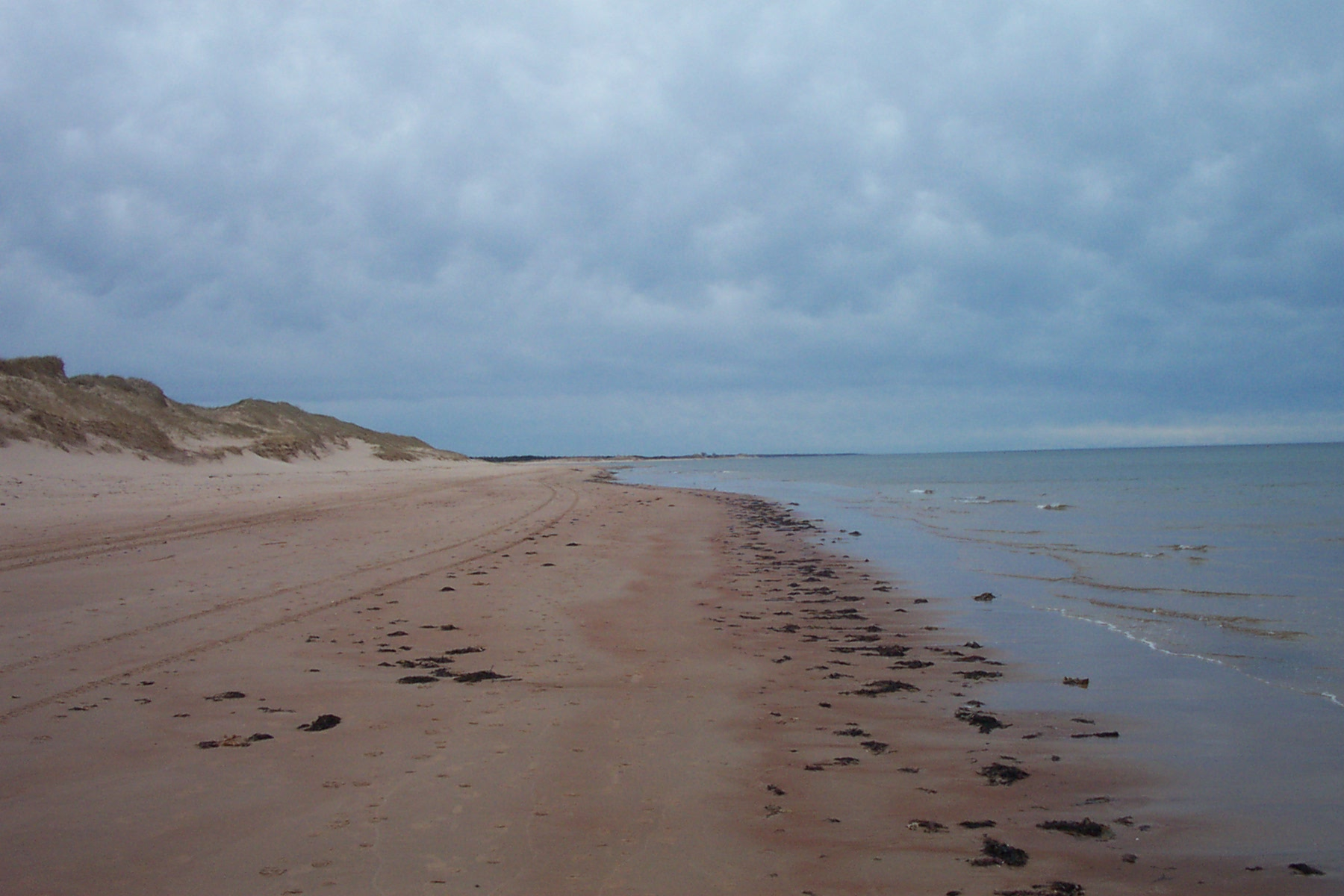
Greenwich, Prince Edward Island

Greenwich is an unincorporated community in the Canadian province of Prince Edward Island, located in Kings County.

Located on the Greenwich Peninsula, which extends northwest from St. Peters, creating St. Peters Bay, the community of Greenwich is located in the northwestern part of Kings County at 46°26′N 62°38′W.

Primarily a farming hamlet, the westernmost part of the Greenwich Peninsula — fronting on the Gulf of St. Lawrence and part of Prince Edward Island National Park — is an extensive sand dune field covering dozens of hectares, as well as several sand beaches. Mostly used by local residents until the 1970s, the Greenwich peninsula was largely unknown to tourists as it did not have good roads and was not near major attractions.

This changed after a New York City real estate developer purchased several abandoned farms and part of the dune field in the area during the 1980s and proposed a major golf course and exclusive resort on the property, creating a stir in publicity and causing an outcry among Islanders who feared loss of access to the area, and by environmentalists, who feared irreparable damage to the ecosystem. Islanders and tourists began to explore Greenwich's dune fields in increasing numbers and the pedestrian and frequently, illegal motorized vehicle use, was causing damage to the dunes. The provincial government held many public meetings which resulted in the government acquiring the land as part of a real estate swap with the American developer.

Local Member of Parliament Lawrence MacAulay was elected to the riding of Cardigan in 1988 and became a Cabinet minister in the government of Prime Minister Jean Chrétien in 1993. MacAulay lobbied for Parks Canada and the provincial government to come to an agreement that would see the Greenwich property added to Prince Edward Island National Park.

The national park was officially expanded in 1998 when 6 square kilometres of the Greenwich Peninsula were transferred from the provincial government to Parks Canada. Parks Canada has implemented a development plan which has controlled access to the dune field and prevented pedestrians and motorized vehicles from trespassing on sensitive areas. A visitor centre was constructed and a new beach complex was built at the eastern end of the property.
