= Andrew Macphail =

Canadian physician and writer

Sir Andrew Macphail
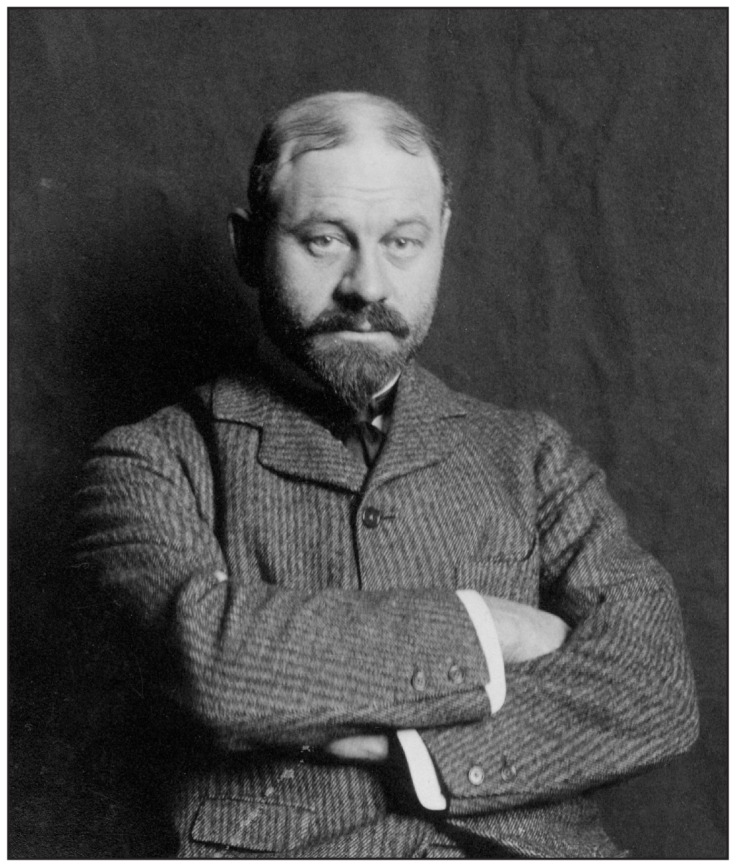
- Macphail, c. 1907
- Born: John Andrew Macphail; November 24, 1864; Orwell, Colony of Prince Edward Island
- Died: September 23, 1938 (aged 73); Montreal, Quebec, Canada
- Spouse: Georgina Burlan
- Children: Jeffrey, Dorothy
- Writing career
- Language: English
- Notable works: Three Persons, The Master's Wife
- Notable awards: Knighthood, FRSC, Lorne Pierce Medal

Sir John Andrew Macphail, OBE, FRSC (November 24, 1864 – September 23, 1938) was a Canadian physician, author, professor of medicine, and soldier. Macphail was a prolific writer, and an influential intellectual during the early twentieth century.

== Life and work ==
Macphail was born on November 24, 1864, in Orwell, on the family's newly purchased 100-acre farm. His father was William Macphail, a schoolmaster; his mother was Catherine Moore Smith formerly of Newton, P.E.I.

Macphail was educated at Prince of Wales College in Charlottetown, and then at McGill University in Montreal, where he received his medical degree in 1891. While studying at McGill, Macphail wrote a number of reviews and articles for the Montreal Gazette, the Chicago Times and other newspapers. Some of the money from this work was spent on a trip around the world.

Mcphail resumed his studies in England, where he became, a member of the Royal College of Surgeons and was licensed by the Royal College of Physicians.

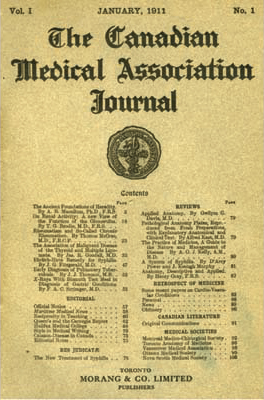
First issue of Canadian Medical Association Journal, January 1911.

In 1892, Mcphail returned to Canada, and the next year, he married Georgina Burland of Montreal. They had two children, Jeffrey and Dorothy.

From 1893 until 1905, Macphail practised medicine and taught at the University of Bishop's College. At Bishop's, he was professor of the diseases of children. Beginning in 1895, he also served as a consulting pathologist at the city's Western and Verdun hospitals.

In 1903, he became editor of the Montreal Medical Journal. Eight years later this publication merged with another medical periodical, and Mcphail became editor of the resulting Canadian Medical Association Journal. He was editor of the Journal until the outbreak of World War I.

He was appointed McGill's first Professor of the History of Medicine in 1907, and held that position until 1937.

Macphail enlisted in World War I, at age 50, and served at the front with a field ambulance corps for 20 months. As a member of the Sixth Field Ambulance, he served in several battles, including Vimy Ridge.

== Writing ==
Macphail wrote The Medical Services, Volume One of the Official History of the Canadian Forces in the Great War. His volume was published in 1925 and included criticism of the minister of militia and the surgeon general. It "caused a major controversy in political and military circles."

He wrote an essay on Canadian poet John McCrae, "An essay in character," for the 1919 edition of McCrae's In Flanders Fields And Other Poems.

Macphail was also a novelist. The vine of Sibmah: a relation of the Puritans (1906) is a romantic novel set in the Restoration period. In 1921, he published the first translation of Louis Hémon's classic Maria Chapdelaine.

Macphail published four one-act plays: The land (1914), The last rising (1930), Company (1936), and The new house (1937). None of these were performed. The Land, based loosely on The Taming of the Shrew, decried market speculation, class inequality, and changing family values, and promoted a return to a rural way of life.

In 1929, Mcphail write a book, Three persons, consisted of detailed reviews of the memoirs written by three First World War authors, including T. E. Lawrence. The reviews received attention in both Canada and Europe; the London Mercury labelled the book 'the most devastating review published in the last hundred years.'"

Throughout his career, Macphail wrote many essays; this literary form gave him an outlet for his forceful personality and ideas. His 1905 series, Essays in puritanism, presented biographical studies of literary and religious figures; Essays in politics in 1903 discussed contemporary political issues concerning connections between Canada and Great Britain; and 1910's Essays in fallacy consisted of detailed critiques of progressive trends of the day.

=== University Magazine ===
Many of Macphail's essays were taken from the University Magazine, a literary journal which he founded in 1907 and (except for the four years of World War I) edited until its closing in 1920. It has been called "an outstanding Canadian quarterly" by Ian Ross Robertson. The Governor General, Earl Grey, called it "the best periodical published in Canada." Sponsored by Dalhousie, McGill and Toronto universities, its contributors included Rudyard Kipling, several cabinet ministers, and many Canadian academics and literary figures such as Stephen Leacock and Marjorie Pickthall.

=== The Master's Wife ===
Macphail's book The Master's Wife was published posthumously, in 1939. It is the book to which Macphail "devoted most care, and which he considered his best." Part biography of himself and his family ("The Master" was his father), part history of their community, Orwell, the book has been called "an excellent description of 19th century life on P.E.I., a very important social history of P.E.I.'s past."

A facsimile of the 1939 edition is sold by the University of Prince Edward Island's Institute of Island Studies, with all profits going to the Sir Andrew Macphail Foundation.

== Recognition ==
In January 1918, Macphail received a knighthood as a Knight Bachelor for his literary accomplishments and military service.

He was awarded an honorary doctorate from McGill. He received the Quebec government prize for literature in 1928.

Macphail was elected a Fellow of the Royal Society of Canada in 1910. In 1930, the Society awarded him its Lorne Pierce Medal.

=== Sir Andrew Macphail Homestead ===
The Andrew Macphail Foundation preserves his birthplace and its 140-acre property in Orwell as a museum, the Sir Andrew Macphail Homestead. It is the site of the Macphail Woods Ecological Forestry Project, a joint effort of the Foundation and the Environmental Coalition of Prince Edward Island to preserve the old-growth Acadian Forest covering much of the property.

== Publications ==
- Essays in Politics. London, New York: Longman's Green, 1903.
- Essays in Puritanism. London: T.F. Unwin, 1905.
- Essays in Fallacy. New York: Longmans Green, 1910.
- The Book of Sorrow. London, New York: Oxford U P, 1916.
- The Cavendish Lecture on a Day's Work. London: Lancet, 1917.
- Official History of the Canadian Forces in the Great War 1914-1919: The Medical Services. Ottawa: Acland, 1925.
- An Address on American Methods in Medical Education. London: British Medical Association, 1927.
- Three Persons. London: J. Murray, 1929.
- The Bible in Scotland. London: J. Murray, 1931.
- Our Canadian Speech. Montreal: La Patrie, 1935.
- The Master's Wife. Toronto: McClelland and Stewart.

Fiction and drama

- The Vine of Sibmah: A Relation of the Puritans. New York: Macmillan, 1906.
- The Land. 1914.
- The Last Rising. 1930.
- Company. 1936.
- The New House. 1937.

Selected articles

- "John Knox and the Church of England," The University Magazine, Vol. VI, 1907.
- "Loyalty — to What," The University Magazine, Vol. VI, 1907.
- "The Patience of England," The University Magazine, Vol. VI, 1907.
- "What Can Canada Do," The University Magazine, Vol. VI, 1907.
- "The American Woman," Part II, The Living Age, Vol. CCLIX, 1908.
- "The Dominion and the Spirit," The University Magazine, Vol. VII, 1908.
- "Protection and Politics," The University Magazine, Vol. VII, 1908.
- "Why the Conservatives Failed," The University Magazine, Vol. VII, 1908.
- "New Lamps for Old," The University Magazine, Vol. VIII, 1909.
- "British Diplomacy and Canada," The University Magazine, Vol. VIII, 1909.
- "The Nine Prophets," The University Magazine, Vol. VIII, 1909.
- "Canadian Writers and American Politics," The University Magazine, Vol. IX, 1910.
- "Oxford and Working-class Education," The University Magazine, Vol. IX, 1910.
- "An Obverse View of Education," The University Magazine, Vol. IX, 1910.
- "A Voice from the East," The University Magazine, Vol. IX, 1910.
- "The New Theology," The University Magazine, Vol. IX, 1910.
- "Certain Varieties of the Apples of Sodom," The University Magazine, Vol. X, 1911.
- "The Cleaning of the Slate," The University Magazine, Vol. X, 1911.
- "Confiscatory Legislation," The University Magazine, Vol. X, 1911.
- "Why the Liberals Failed," The University Magazine, Vol. X, 1911.
- "The Tariff Commission," The University Magazine, Vol. XI, 1912.
- "The Cost of Living," The University Magazine, Vol. XI, 1912.
- "The Navy and Politics," The University Magazine, Vol. XII, 1913.
- "Unto the Church," The University Magazine, Vol. XII, 1913.
- "Theory and Practice," The University Magazine, Vol. XII, 1913.
- "The Hill of Error," The University Magazine, Vol. XII, 1913.
- "The Dominion and the Provinces," The University Magazine, Vol. XII, 1913.
- "Patriotism and Politics," The University Magazine, Vol. XIII, 1914.
- "On Certain Aspects of Feminism," The University Magazine, Vol. XIII, 1914.
- "Consequences and Penalties," The University Magazine, Vol. XIII, 1914.
- "The Day of Wrath," The University Magazine, Vol. XIII, 1914.
- "Val Cartier Camp," The University Magazine, Vol. XIII, 1914.
- "An Ambulance in Rest," The University Magazine, Vol. XVI, 1917.
- "In this Our Necessity," The University Magazine, Vol. XVI, 1917.
- "The Conservative," The University Magazine, Vol. XVIII, 1919.
- "Women in Democracy," The University Magazine, Vol. XIX, No. 1, 1920.
- "The Immigrant," The University Magazine, Vol. XIX, No. 2, 1920.

Other works

- In Flanders Fields, by John McCrae, with an essay by Andrew Macphail, 1919.
- A Vista, by John Crichton, with a preface by Andrew Macphail, 1921.
- Selected Poems, by Arthur Bourinot, with a note by Andrew Macphail, 1935.
