= Orwell, Prince Edward Island =

Coordinates: 46.157°N 62.839°W

Location of Orwell in Prince Edward Island

Orwell is a settlement in Queens County, Prince Edward Island.

Canadian professor, physician, and intellectual Sir Andrew Macphail was born in Orwell on November 24, 1864. The Sir Andrew Macphail Foundation preserves his family home and its 140-acre property in Orwell as a museum, the Sir Andrew Macphail Homestead. The Homestead is the site of the Macphail Woods Ecological Forestry Project, a joint effort of the Foundation and the Environmental Coalition of Prince Edward Island to preserve the old-growth Acadian Forest covering much of the property.
