= 2002 royal tour of Canada =

2002 visit by the Queen and the Duke of Edinburgh

As we "stand on guard" in these opening years of the twenty-first century, I see a Canada which is a much respected global player, a major economic force, a valued Commonwealth leader, a great country. It is therefore with special pride that I take this opportunity during my Jubilee year to pay tribute to Canadians everywhere and to thank you for the support and affection you have given to me over these past fifty years. It is a privilege to serve you as Queen of Canada to the best of my ability, to play my part in the Canadian identity, to uphold Canadian traditions and heritage, to recognise Canadian excellence and achievement, and to seek to give a sense of continuity in these exciting, ever-changing times in which we are fortunate enough to live.

— Elizabeth II of Canada, 2002

The 2002 royal tour of Canada by Elizabeth II, Queen of Canada, and her consort Prince Philip, Duke of Edinburgh, took place from 4 to 15 October 2002. The Queen and the Duke toured the Canadian provinces of British Columbia, New Brunswick, Manitoba, Ontario, Quebec, Saskatchewan, and the territory of Nunavut in celebration of her Golden Jubilee as Canada's Queen.

== Tour ==
For 12 days in October 2002, the Queen and the Duke of Edinburgh toured Canada, making stops in Victoria, Vancouver, Regina, Winnipeg, Toronto, Hamilton, Hull, Fredericton, Sussex, Moncton, and Ottawa.

=== Nunavut ===
Your land is indeed your strength. For the past three years, this rich expanse has been yours in its most precious sense and it bears the name you chose: that speaks of your ancestors, Canada's original citizens, one of the nation's founding cultures; that speaks of your Elders, whose lifelong struggles are part of the foundations upon which you are building a bright future for the Nunavummiut; and that speaks of your youth, to whom you entrust that future. They are the key to increasing prosperity in the Nunavut of tomorrow.

— Elizabeth II of Canada, 2002

The trip was also unique in that it was the first royal visit to the new territory of Nunavut, where the royal couple made their first Canadian stop in Iqaluit. There, on 4 October, the Queen opened and addressed the new legislative assembly, stating in her speech: "I am proud to be the first member of the Canadian Royal Family to be greeted in Canada's newest territory." After a walk-about through Iqaluit, the Queen unveiled one of the street signs on the town's main thoroughfare, which had been renamed in her honour.

=== British Columbia ===
From Nunavut, the royal party flew to Victoria, where the Queen and the Duke of Edinburgh were received by the province's lieutenant governor. Saturday was spent at a private retreat and, on the Sunday, the Queen attended religious services at Christ Church Cathedral, performed an unscheduled walk-about after the sermon, and travelled to the provincial parliament building to unveil a stained glass window commemorating the Golden Jubilee. Once the Queen was outside of the legislature, the Snowbirds performed an acrobatic fly-by for the sovereign and a gathered audience of some 16,000.

In Vancouver, on 6 October, the Queen, accompanied by Wayne Gretzky, and in front of a crowd of 18,000 at General Motors Place, dropped the ceremonial first puck for the National Hockey League exhibition game between the Vancouver Canucks and San Jose Sharks; this was the first time any reigning monarch, Canadian or otherwise, had performed the task. The Queen and the Duke then watched the first period of the game from the royal box—the first time they had done so since their first hockey game at Maple Leaf Gardens in 1951. Premier Gordon Campbell said during the visit: "Your Majesty, much as the world has changed in the last 50 years, one thing has always remained constant—the sincere affection between the people of British Columbia and their Queen."

In her speech at the Fairmont Hotel, the Queen said that she was told of a story about her mother during her visit to Canada in 1939. She said, "My father and mother were scheduled to visit a veterans' hospital in the province of Quebec during their six week tour. Two Boer War veterans, both of Scots heritage, argued for weeks before my parents' arrival. One said "She was born in Scotland, so I say she's Scots". The other said "She married an English man, so I say she's English". They decided to let Queen Elizabeth settle their cultural differences. When the two were presented to Her Majesty, they asked "Are you Scots, or are you English?" My mother paused, and then replied "Since I have landed in Quebec, I think we can say that I am a Canadian"".

=== Saskatchewan & Manitoba ===
The equestrian statue of Elizabeth II in Regina, Saskatchewan, created to commemorate the Queen's Golden Jubilee as Queen of Canada

The couple was next in Regina, Saskatchewan, unveiling on the grounds of the provincial parliament the product of the Golden Jubilee Statue Project: a bronze equestrian statue of the Queen riding Burmese, a horse gifted in 1969 to the Queen by the RCMP. In Winnipeg, Manitoba, the Queen performed a walk-about at The Forks, re-dedicated the newly restored Golden Boy statue atop the Manitoba Legislative Building, and attended an evening performance of the Royal Winnipeg Ballet, accompanied by the Winnipeg Symphony Orchestra and Loreena McKennitt.

=== Ontario ===
The Queen and the Duke were on 9 October welcomed to Ontario by the lieutenant governor and thousands onlookers in Toronto, and, that evening, appeared at a festival, mounted at Exhibition Place, highlighting the advance of the province over the previous five decades. After a day of relaxation, the Queen then ventured to Sheridan College, to view students learning computer animation, and Hamilton, where at Copps Coliseum she, as their colonel-in-chief, presented the Argyll and Sutherland Highlanders of Canada with their new Colours. Rejoined by Prince Philip, the Queen attended at the Canadian Broadcasting Corporation's Toronto headquarters an event marking the organisation's 50th anniversary; there, she viewed exhibits and was amused by a video display showing her earlier tours of Canada in the 1950s. Finally, the royal couple were in the audience at Roy Thomson Hall for a gala concert of Canadian talent, including Oscar Peterson, Evelyn Hart, Rex Harrington, Cirque du Soleil, The Tragically Hip, and others. At the same time, the Lieutenant-Governor-in-Council named a park near Gravenhurst as the Queen Elizabeth II Wildlands Provincial Park and created the Ontario Golden Jubilee Award for Civilian Bravery.

=== New Brunswick ===
As the tour continued on to the maritime provinces, the royal party arrived at Government House in Fredericton, New Brunswick, where they were welcomed by thousands. The stop in this province was brief, however—only 25 hours in total—with the Queen and the Duke of Edinburgh flying by helicopter the following morning from Fredericton to Sussex and then on to Moncton, where they attended a luncheon in Dieppe to celebrate the town's 50th anniversary and officially opened a new terminal at Greater Moncton International Airport.

=== Ottawa ===
On this Thanksgiving Weekend in my Golden Jubilee year, I want to take the opportunity to express my profound gratitude to all Canadians, those of you here tonight and those of you across the country or serving overseas, for the loyalty, encouragement and support you have given to me over these past fifty years. Your understanding and compassion, your confidence and engagement, are sources of inspiration to me. I would like to affirm before you tonight that, wherever the future may take us, my admiration and affection for Canada and Canadians everywhere is - and will always remain - clear, strong and sure. That too, Ladies and Gentlemen, is for me a constant, an enduring point of reference in these times of change.

— Elizabeth II of Canada, 2002

From the east coast the royal couple flew westwards again to the national capital, Ottawa, to be greeted there by Deputy Prime Minister John Manley, who had earlier, on the day of the Queen's arrival in Canada, caused controversy by stating Canada should become a republic. The day following, 13 October, a multi-faith Thanksgiving celebration was held on Parliament Hill for about 3,500 people, and the Queen laid a wreath at the Tomb of the Unknown Soldier. A state dinner was held that evening at the Canadian Museum of Civilization in Gatineau, Quebec, at which the Queen said: "[I wish] to express my profound gratitude to all Canadians... for the loyalty, encouragement and support you have given to me over these past 50 years." As her motorcade passed across the Ottawa River into Quebec, about 100 protesters yelled obscenities at the Queen in French, waving Quebec flags and chanting "We want a country, not a monarchy"; it was the only protest during the jubilee tour of Canada.

On the last full day of the tour, the Queen, as Honorary Commissioner, watched a performance of the Royal Canadian Mounted Police's Musical Ride before moving to her final major event in Canada: a lunch at Rideau Hall for fifty distinguished Canadians—one from each year of the Queen's reign. The Queen also planted another tree on the grounds of her Canadian residence, and met with members of the Royal Commonwealth Society. The Queen and the Duke of Edinburgh then departed Canada on 15 October.

== See also ==
- Royal tours of Canada
- List of royal tours of Canada (18th–20th centuries)
- List of royal tours of Canada (21st century)
- 2011 royal tour of Canada
- 2022 royal tour of Canada
