= List of royal tours of Canada (21st century) =

Royal tours of Canada in the 21st century carry on the tradition of the previous 300 years, either as an official tour, a working tour, a vacation, or a period of military service by a member of the Royal Family. Originally, royal tours of Canada were events predominantly for Canadians to see and possibly meet members of their royal family, with the associated patriotic pomp and spectacle. However, nearing the end of the 20th century, such occasions took on the added dimension of a theme; for instance, the 2005 tour of Saskatchewan and Alberta by Queen Elizabeth II and Prince Philip, Duke of Edinburgh, was deemed to be a vehicle for the Queen and all other Canadians to honour "The Spirit of Nation Builders". Also, junior members of the Royal Family began to undertake unofficial "working" tours of Canada as well; in this method, royal figures are invited by provinces, municipalities, and other organizations to events which the latter fund without assistance from the federal government. King Charles III; Anne, Princess Royal; Prince Andrew, Duke of York; and Prince Edward, Duke of Edinburgh, have all made several small tours in this fashion.

== Canadian royal family ==
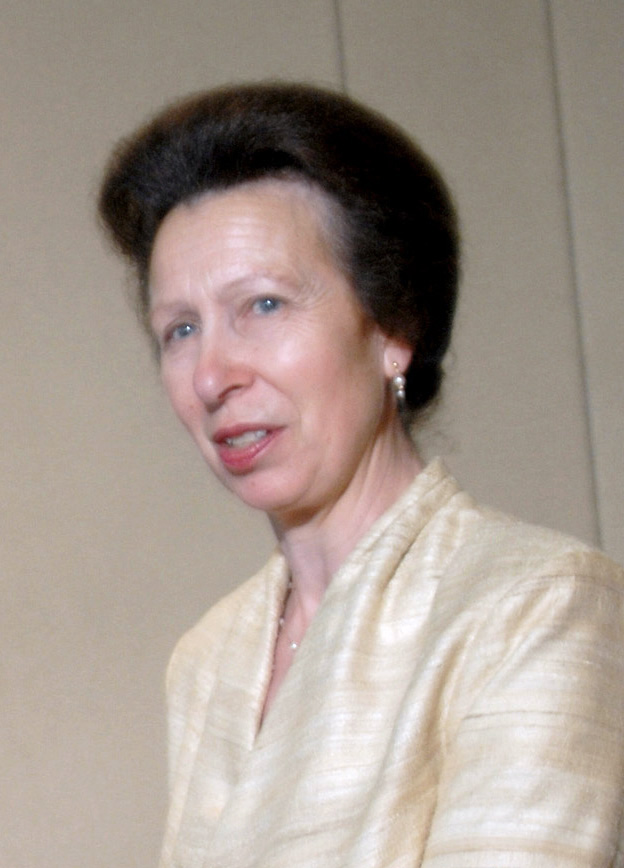
The Princess Royal visited King George School, Saskatoon, in 2004

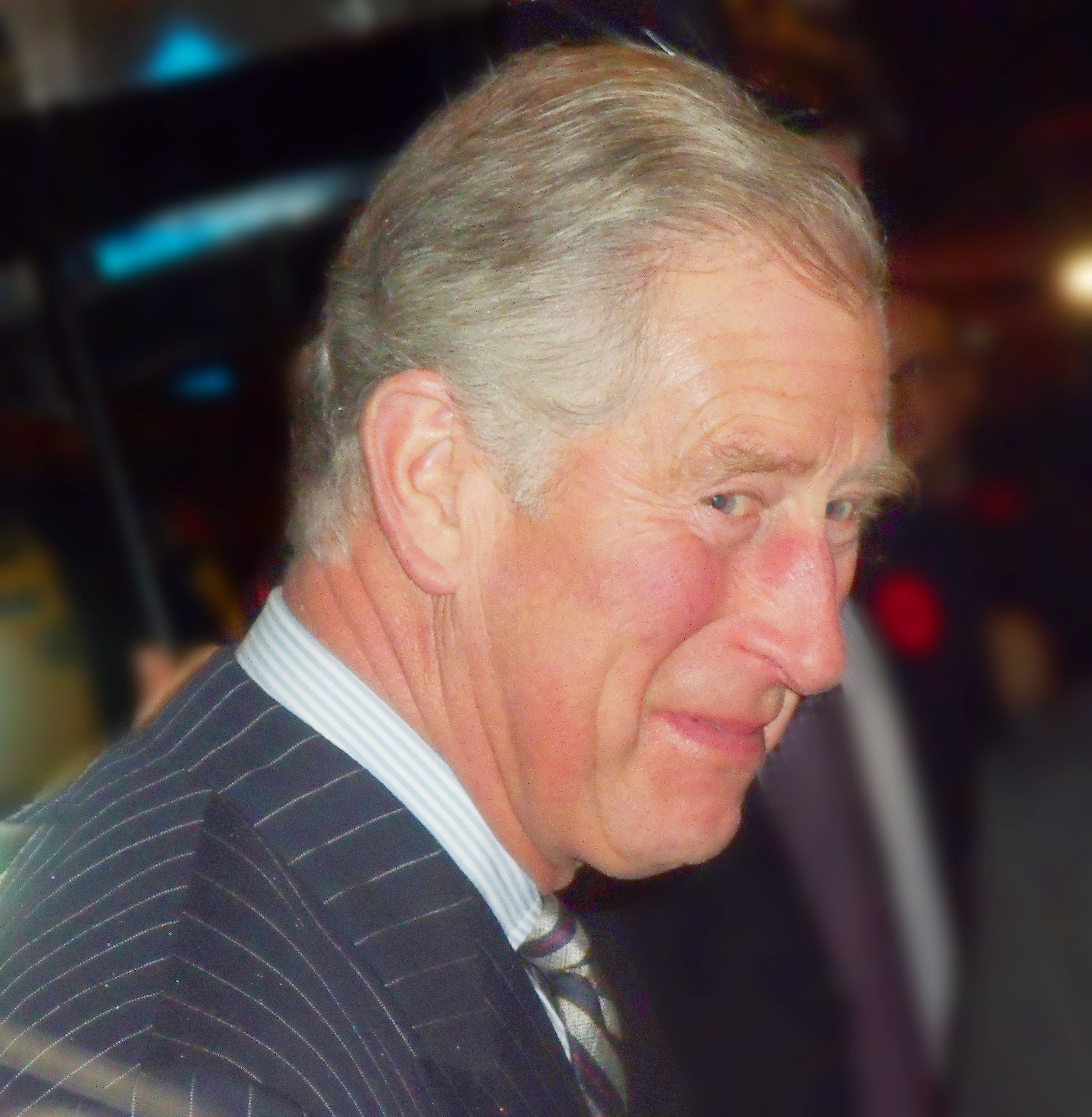
The Prince of Wales (later King Charles III), in Toronto, 4 November 2009

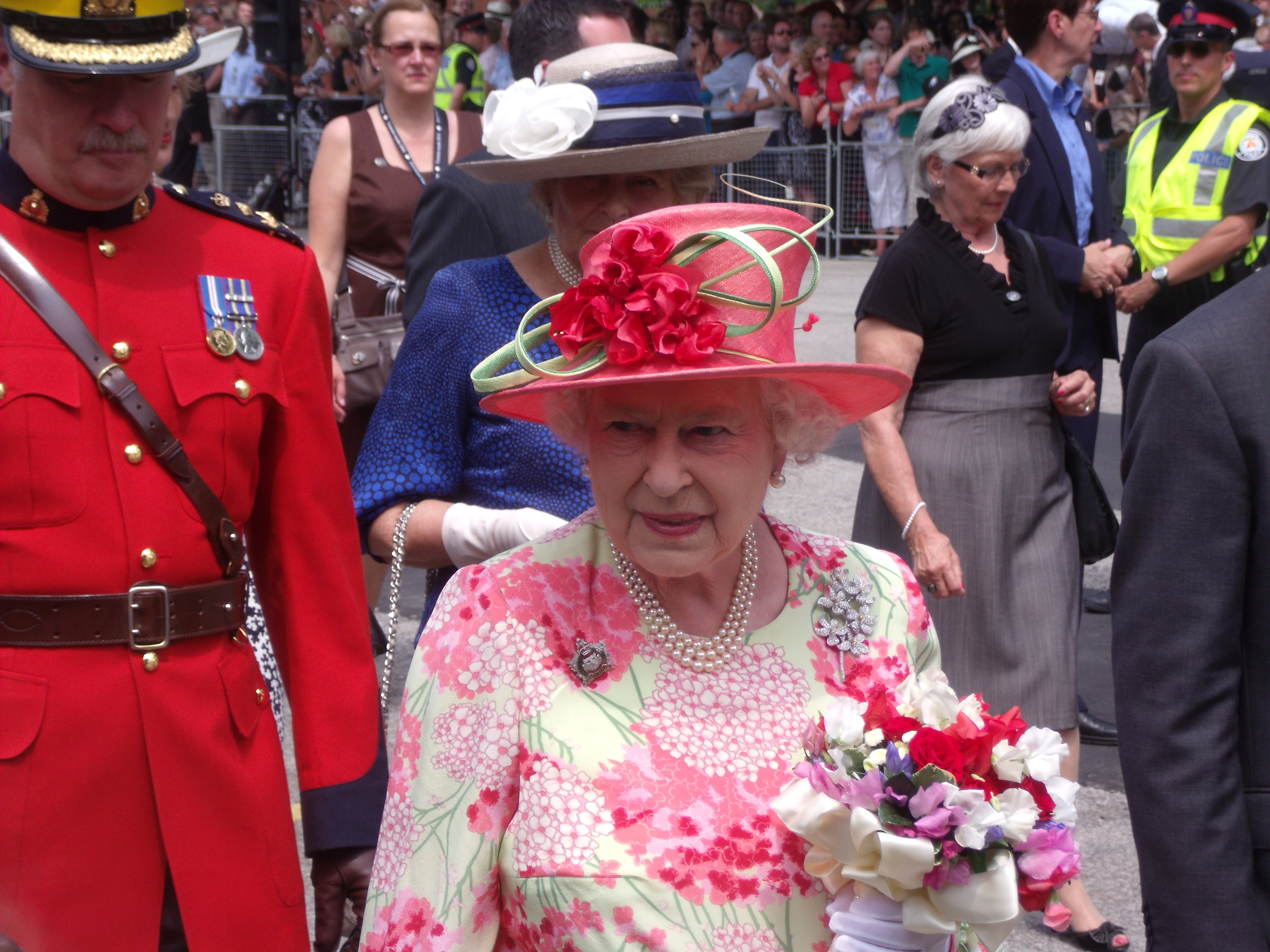
Queen Elizabeth II during a walkabout in Queen's Park, Toronto, July 2010

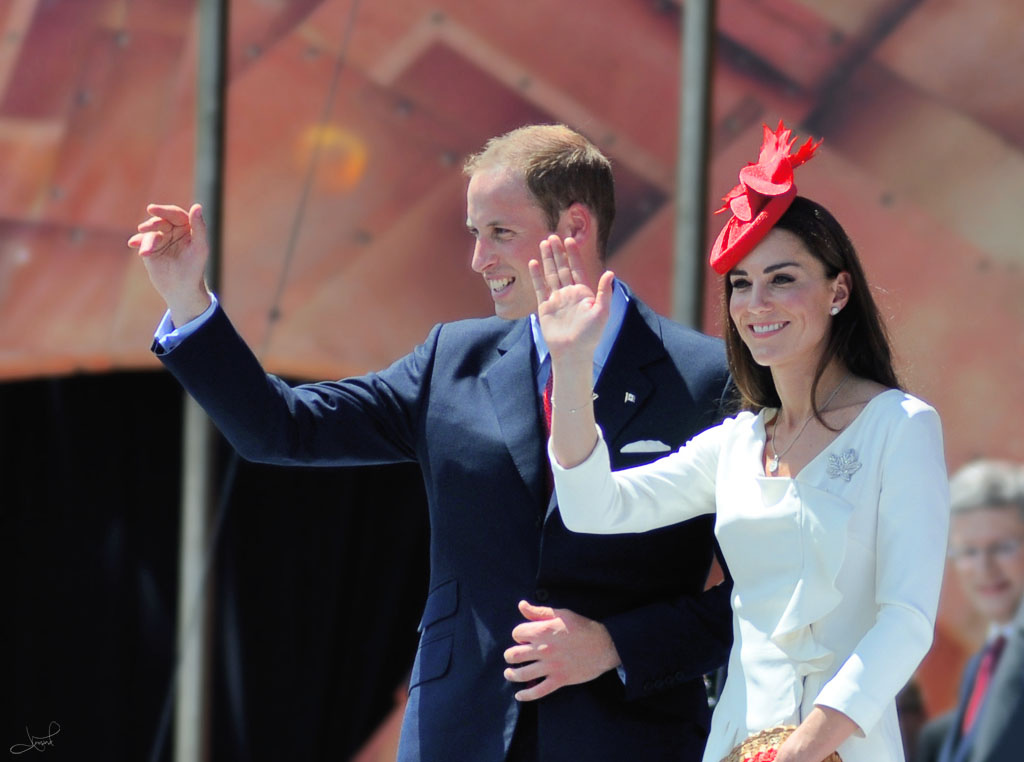
The Duke and Duchess of Cambridge on Parliament Hill on Canada Day, July 2011

King Charles III delivering the 2025 Speech from the Throne

=== 2000–2009 ===
Year	Dates	Persons	Locations	Reasons
2000	4–6 June	The Earl of Wessex	Quebec: Montreal
2000	25–27 June	The Earl of Wessex	British Columbia: Vancouver *
2000	14–18 July	The Earl and Countess of Wessex	Nova Scotia: Halifax; Newfoundland and Labrador: St. John's; Prince Edward Island: Charlottetown, Fanningbank, Indian River, New Annan, Borden-Carleton, Cavendish; Quebec: Montreal	To attend events for the Duke of Edinburgh's Award – Young Canadians' Challenge, attend performance of Emily Confederation Centre of the Arts, visit Rodd Brudenell River Resort, attend concert at St. Mary's Church, visit Cavendish Farms processing plant, visit Gateway Village, attend federal dinner at Delta Prince Edward Hotel, visit to All Souls' Chapel, attend luncheon at Government House, visit Confederation Birthplace Commemorative Park, attend official opening of the 39th annual Canadian Branch Conference of the Commonwealth Parliamentary Association, attend reception with delegates and families at Fanningbank.
2000	28 September–3 October	The Duke of York	Ontario: Toronto; Quebec: Montreal	To be invested as Colonel-in-Chief of the Queen's York Rangers, attend events for Round Square, attend the state funeral of Pierre Trudeau.
2000	23–26 November	The Duke and Duchess of Kent	British Columbia: Vancouver	To attend the dedication ceremony of the Waveney lifeboat White Rose of Yorkshire.
2001	26–27 January	The Duke of York	Ontario: Toronto	To visit a former Chaplain at Lakefield College School.
2001	4–8 April	The Duke of Kent	British Columbia: Vancouver	As President of the Royal National Lifeboat Association.
2001	25–30 April	The Prince of Wales (later Charles III)	Ontario: Ottawa, Toronto; Saskatchewan: Regina, Moose Jaw, Assiniboia, Saskatoon; Yukon: Whitehorse, Mayo	In addition to the nation's capital, the Prince visited the only two regions of the country not previously visited — Saskatchewan and Yukon — to complete "his Canadian journey".
2001	2–5 August	The Earl and Countess of Wessex	Alberta: Edmonton	To attend the 8th IAAF World Championships.
2001	19–21 October	The Duke of Edinburgh	Ontario: Toronto	To present Duke of Edinburgh's Awards, attend events for the World Wildlife Fund.
2001	19–21 October	The Duke and Duchess of Kent	Ontario: Toronto
2002	13–24 March	Prince Michael of Kent	Alberta: Calgary, Edmonton; British Columbia: Vancouver, Victoria; Ontario: Toronto, Windsor	To undertake duties as Colonel-in-Chief of the Essex and Kent Scottish.
2002	21–25 June	Prince and Princess Michael of Kent	Ontario: Toronto	To attend the Queen's Plate.
2002	5–8 September	The Earl and Countess of Wessex	Ontario: Toronto	To attend events for the Duke of Edinburgh's Award.
2002	20–24 September	The Earl and Countess of Wessex	Ontario: Toronto, Ottawa	To attend events for the Duke of Edinburgh's Award.
2002	4–15 October	The Queen and the Duke of Edinburgh	British Columbia: Victoria, Vancouver; New Brunswick: Fredericton, Sussex, Moncton; Manitoba: Winnipeg; Ontario: Ottawa, Toronto, Oakville, Hamilton; Quebec: Hull; Nunavut: Iqaluit	To celebrate the Queen's Golden Jubilee.
2003	6–12 May	The Duke of York	British Columbia: Vancouver; Ontario: Toronto	To visit with the Queen's York Rangers, meet with trustees at Lakefield College School, turn the sod for the new mental health building of the British Columbia's Children's Hospital, visit the Regent Park Duke of York Public School, present Duke of Edinburgh's Awards, attend the Children Circle of Care Conference.
2003	12–17 June	The Duke of York	British Columbia: Victoria; Ontario: Toronto	To visit Lakefield College School, attend lunch with the Empire Club of Canada, visit the Greenwood School, visit Lester B. Pearson College.
2003	18–25 June	The Earl and Countess of Wessex	Saskatchewan: Regina, Moose Jaw, Lloydminster, Prince Albert	Centenaries of Regina, Moose Jaw and Lloydminster, open cultural centre, open the Saskatchewan Indian Federated College facility at the University of Regina.
2003	31 July–6 August	Prince and Princess Michael of Kent	Ontario: Kenora	Centenary and re-opening of the Lake of the Woods Yacht Club, opening of the Leo Mol garden.
2003	29 August–1 September	The Princess Royal	Ontario: Kingston, Ottawa	To visit with the Canadian Forces Communications and Electronics Branch, perform charity work.
2004	26–27 April	The Duke of Edinburgh	Ontario: Toronto	To attend the 40th Anniversary Gala for the Duke of Edinburgh's Award.
2004	4–8 June	The Princess Royal	Ontario: Toronto; Saskatchewan: Regina	To attend ceremonies marking the 60th anniversary of D-Day, visit the Royal Regina Rifles, visit the Monarchist League of Canada, attend the Commonwealth Study Conference.
2004	13–18 October	Prince Michael of Kent	Ontario: Windsor	To open new joint Windsor Armoury and Police training facility.
2005	17–25 May	The Queen and the Duke of Edinburgh	Alberta: Edmonton, Calgary; Saskatchewan: Regina, Saskatoon, Lumsden	Centenary of the entry of Saskatchewan and Alberta into Confederation.
2006	11 May	The Duke of York	Ontario: Toronto, Peterborough, Lakefield	To celebrate the 10th anniversary of the Canadian Canoe Museum.
2006	1–9 June	The Earl and Countess of Wessex	Alberta: Calgary, Edmonton; British Columbia: Vancouver, Victoria; Ontario: Toronto, Peterborough; Saskatchewan: Regina, Moose Jaw	To visit the Monarchist League of Canada, attend events for the Ontario Heritage Trust.
2006	22 November	The Countess of Wessex	Ontario: Toronto	Visit Medical Discovery Tower at Toronto General Hospital and launch the Girls Programme at Verity Women's Club.
2007	30 April – 5 May	The Duke of York	Nova Scotia: Halifax; Ontario: Cambridge, Toronto
2007	1–4 June	The Princess Royal	Saskatchewan: Regina, Yorkton, Saltcoats	Centenary of the Royal Regina Rifles, open the Royal Canadian Mounted Police Heritage Centre, attend a demonstration by the Parkland Therapeutic Riding Association, celebrate the 125th anniversary of the settlement of the Yorkton, attend Regina's Freedom of the City Parade, meet with First Nations elders, and attend Saskatchewan Youth Awards gala.
2007	26 June	Prince Harry	Alberta: Calgary, Medicine Hat, CFB Suffield	To train with Canadian Forces soldiers for a tour of duty in Afghanistan.
2008	10–11 May	The Duke of York	Ontario: Peterborough	To open a display at the Canadian Canoe Museum.
2008	5–9 June	The Earl of Wessex	Manitoba: Winnipeg; Ontario: Toronto, Kingston, Aylmer, St. Thomas, Niagara-on-the-Lake	To participate in a number of events on behalf of various charitable organizations.
2009	23–28 April	The Duke of York	Nova Scotia: Halifax; Ontario: Lakefield, Toronto; Quebec: Georgeville, Montreal	To participate in a number of events relating to the Princess Louise Fusiliers.
2009	4–8 June	The Earl and Countess of Wessex	Alberta: Calgary; British Columbia: Victoria	To undertake duties relating to the Royal Canadian Mounted Police, Duke of Edinburgh's Award, South Alberta Light Horse, and open the Air Force Museum of Alberta.
2009	6 September-3 October	Prince Harry	Alberta: Calgary, Medicine Hat, CFB Suffield	Private working visit for the purpose of participating in a military exercise.
2009	19 September	Princess Beatrice of York and Princess Eugenie of York	Ontario: Toronto	To accompany their mother, Sarah, Duchess of York, at the premiere of The Young Victoria at the Toronto International Film Festival.
2009	2–12 November	The Prince of Wales and the Duchess of Cornwall (later Charles III and Queen Camilla)	British Columbia: Vancouver, Victoria; Newfoundland and Labrador: St. John's, Cupids, Brigus; Ontario: Ottawa, Toronto, Hamilton, Niagara-on-the-Lake, Petawawa; Quebec: Montreal

=== 2010–2019 ===
Year	Dates	Persons	Locations	Reasons
2010	19–22 March	The Earl and Countess of Wessex	British Columbia: Vancouver, Whistler	Attend events at the 2010 Winter Paralympics, meet with First Nations leaders and officers of the Royal Canadian Mounted Police, and distribute The Duke of Edinburgh's Awards.
2010	23–25 April	The Princess Royal	Newfoundland and Labrador: St. John's
2010	18–22 April	The Earl and Countess of Wessex	British Columbia: Vancouver	Attend paralympic games.
2010	25 April	Princess Alexandra	Ontario: Toronto	Visit the Queen's Own Rifles of Canada
2010	28 June–6 July	The Queen and the Duke of Edinburgh	Manitoba: Winnipeg; Nova Scotia: Halifax; Ontario: Toronto, Ottawa, Waterloo	Celebrate the centenary of the Canadian navy, attend the Queen's Plate, open a new terminal at the Winnipeg James Armstrong Richardson International Airport, and lay the cornerstone of the Canadian Museum for Human Rights, amongst other events.
2010	24 July	The Earl of Wessex	Alberta: Banff
2011	30 June–8 July	The Duke and Duchess of Cambridge	Northwest Territories: Yellowknife; Prince Edward Island: Charlottetown, Summerside; Quebec: Quebec City, Montreal; Ontario: Ottawa; Alberta: Slave Lake, Calgary	Canada Day celebrations in Ottawa, meeting Slave Lake wildfire firefighters, Calgary Stampede opening ceremonies; the first royal tour for the couple.
2011	11–24 July	The Duke of York, Princess Beatrice, and Princess Eugenie of York	Northwest Territories: Norman Wells	Private canoe trip and opening of North-Wright Airways float base and wilderness expedition support centre.
2011	25–27 July	The Earl of Wessex	Ontario: Toronto	Present the Duke of Edinburgh's Award as the trustee to recipients in Canada.
2011	23–24 November	The Countess of Wessex	Ontario: Toronto	Charitable work, attend Aboriginal culture celebration.
2012	20–23 May	The Prince of Wales and the Duchess of Cornwall	New Brunswick: CFB Gagetown, Fredericton, Saint John; Ontario: Toronto; Saskatchewan: Regina	Diamond Jubilee of Elizabeth II
2012	11–18 September	The Earl and Countess of Wessex	Ontario: Toronto, Hamilton, St. Catharines, Midland; Nunavut: Iqaluit	Meet with the Royal Victorian Order Association of Canada, attend Toronto International Film Festival, present colours to and lunch with the Lincoln and Welland Regiment, view trooping of the colour by the Royal Hamilton Light Infantry, visit Niagara College, Sainte-Marie among the Hurons, and Market Lane School, attend 2015 Pan American Games briefing, distribute The Duke of Edinburgh's Awards, Queen Elizabeth II Diamond Jubilee Medals, and Royal Canadian Police Long Service Medals.
2012	14–19 September	George and Sylvana Windsor, Earl and Countess of St Andrews	(Newfoundland and Labrador): Newfoundland: Placentia	Attended a civic dinner and the launch of the Voices of Placentia Bay festival
2012	19–21 October	Princess Alexandra	British Columbia: Victoria	Centennial of the Canadian-Scottish Regiment.
2013	27 April	The Duke of Edinburgh	Ontario: Toronto	Present new regimental colours to 3rd Battalion, The Royal Canadian Regiment.
2013	16–19 May	The Duke of York	British Columbia: Vancouver, Victoria
2013	23–26 October	The Princess Royal	Ontario: Toronto, Kingston, Barrie	Attend a Duke of Edinburgh's Awards study conference, a reception at Queen's Park, visit CFB Kingston, visit the Royal Canadian Medical Service training centre at CFB Borden, and attend a 33 Signal Regiment dinner at the National Club.
2013	1–2 November	The Earl and Countess of Wessex	Ontario: Toronto	Attend 50th anniversary of the foundation of The Duke of Edinburgh's Award in Canada, attend presentation of accessibility symbol redesign awards.
2014	18–21 May	The Prince of Wales and the Duchess of Cornwall	Prince Edward Island: Charlottetown, Bonshaw, Cornwall; Nova Scotia: Halifax, Pictou; Manitoba: Winnipeg	Centennial of the start of the First World War, the 150th anniversary of the Charlottetown and Quebec City Conferences.
2014	5 June	The Duke of York	Ontario: Aurora	Present new battle honours to the Queen's York Rangers.
2014	12–20 September	The Earl and Countess of Wessex	British Columbia: Victoria, Vancouver, Kelowna, Ditidaht and 'Namgis First Nations; Saskatchewan (Earl of Wessex): Regina, Moose Jaw; Ontario (Countess of Wessex): North Bay, Kitchenuhmaykoosib Inninuwug First Nation	Duke of Edinburgh Awards events, walk a portion of the Trans-Canada Trail, open a new library on the Ditidaht First Nation, community events on 'Namgis First Nation, reception with regional forest fire first responders, barbeque and regimental dinner with the Saskatchewan Dragoons Regiment, lunch with the Saskatchewan Consular Corps, inspect cadets at the Royal Canadian Mounted Police Depot, reception for community leaders.
2014	10–11 November	The Princess Royal and Sir Timothy Laurence	Ontario: Ottawa	Events marking 150th anniversary of Canadian Confederation.
2015	19–20 February	The Princess Royal	Quebec: Montreal	Present Duke of Edinburgh Awards to students, visit McGill University in relation to role as President of the Emerging Leaders' Dialogue, visit Santropol Roulant, visit the Royal Canadian Hussars as Colonel-in-Chief.
2015	26 October–3 November	The Earl of Wessex	Ontario: Toronto; Prince Edward Island; Nova Scotia: Halifax; Newfoundland and Labrador	100th anniversary of Toronto Scottish Regiment, the Duke of Edinburgh's International Award, tour IWK Health Centre; event for community leaders and volunteers at Government House, Halifax.
2015	12–14 November	The Countess of Wessex	Ontario: Toronto	Tour First Nations services and cultural centre, tour Toronto General Hospital and Toronto Western Hospital, attend Royal Agricultural Winter Fair, meet with Lincoln and Welland Regiment,
2016	2 May	Prince Harry	Ontario: Toronto	Invictus Games
2016	28 June–1 July	The Princess Royal	Newfoundland and Labrador: St. John's, Corner Brook	Mark Memorial Day and 100th anniversary of the Battle of the Somme, visit Rainbow Riders therapeutic riding facility.
2016	24 September–1 October	The Duke and Duchess of Cambridge, Prince George, and Princess Charlotte	British Columbia: Victoria, Vancouver, Bella Bella, Kelowna, Haida Gwaii; Yukon: Whitehorse, Carcross
2017	29 June–1 July	The Prince of Wales and the Duchess of Cornwall	Nunavut: Iqaluit; Ontario: Ottawa, Ontario	Canada's sesquicentennial celebration
2017	22–30 September	Prince Harry	Ontario: Toronto	Invictus Games
2018	28 June	The Princess Royal	Ontario: Toronto, Ontario	Spoke at Rotary International's international convention
2018	5–8 November	The Princess Royal	Alberta: Edmonton, Alberta
2019	23–28 May	The Duke of York	Nova Scotia: Halifax; Ontario: Toronto	Following a reception at the residence of Lieutenant Governor Arthur LeBlanc, the Duke took part in a military ceremony which involved the Princess Louise Fusiliers. He later met with entrepreneurs at the inaugural Canadian Pitch@Palace, an initiative founded by the Duke to support entrepreneurs.
2019	14–15 November	The Countess of Wessex	Ontario: Toronto	Attend events for the 100 Women in Finance Next Generation Initiative, The Duke of Edinburgh's Award, Awareness Foundation, and Toronto General and Western Hospitals.

=== 2020–present ===
Year	Dates	Persons	Locations	Reasons
2022	17–19 May	The Prince of Wales and the Duchess of Cornwall	Newfoundland and Labrador: St. John's; Ontario: Ottawa; Northwest Territories: Yellowknife	Platinum Jubilee of Queen Elizabeth II
2023	24–27 April	The Duke of Edinburgh	Ontario: Toronto; British Columbia: Burnaby, Vancouver	To attend The Duke of Edinburgh's International Award, events organized by the Office of the Lieutenant Governor of Ontario, Odd Squad Productions Society, Vancouver Club, and the York House School, as well as meetings and receptions with indigenous and youth representatives, as well as local council members from BC.
2023	13–14 May	Prince Michael	Ontario: Windsor, Chatham	To present new regimental colours to the Essex and Kent Scottish.
2023	18–21 May	The Princess Royal	New Brunswick: Moncton, Sussex	To mark the 125th anniversary of the founding of the 8th Canadian Hussars (Princess Louise's).
2023	3–4 June	The Princess Royal	Alberta: Banff	To attend the opening plenary session for The Duke of Edinburgh's Commonwealth Study Conference.
2023	3–8 November	The Duchess of Edinburgh	Ontario: St. Catharines, Toronto	To attend the Duchess of Edinburgh military competition hosted by the Lincoln and Welland Regiment, a dinner in support of the Lincoln and Welland Regimental Foundation, a Remembrance Day service, and to visit three University Health Network sites.
2023	20 November	The Duke and Duchess of Sussex	British Columbia: Vancouver	To attend the Vancouver Canucks and the San Jose Sharks hockey game and support the upcoming 2025 Invictus Games.
2024	14–16 February	The Duke and Duchess of Sussex	British Columbia: Vancouver, Whistler	To mark one year until the 2025 Invictus Games, meet participating athletes, and take part in adaptive-sports activities and related events.
2024	3–5 May	The Princess Royal	British Columbia: Esquimalt, North Vancouver, Victoria	Attended a series of engagements with the Royal Canadian Navy as the Commodore-in-Chief of the Canadian Fleet Pacific. Also visited an urban farm, the Royal Victoria Yacht Club, and the Canadian Therapeutic Riding Association as its patron.
2024	17–18 November	The Duke of Sussex	British Columbia: Vancouver	To promote the upcoming 2025 Invictus Games, including attending the Grey Cup and launching the Invictus Games school program.
2025	8–16 February	The Duke and Duchess of Sussex	British Columbia: Vancouver, Whistler	To attend and support the 2025 Invictus Games. The Duchess returned to California on 11 February under a pre-planned arrangement to be with their two children.
2025	26–27 May	The King and Queen	Ontario: Ottawa	To open the 45th Canadian Parliament.
2025	25 June–2 July	The Duke of Edinburgh	Prince Edward Island; Ontario: Toronto, Ottawa	To mark the 150th anniversary of the Prince Edward Island Regiment and attend Canada Day celebrations in Ottawa.
2025	4–8 September	The Duchess of Edinburgh	Alberta: Calgary	To visit the Spruce Meadows.
2025	5–6 November	The Duke of Sussex	Ontario: Toronto	Private visit to attend Canadian veterans and remembrance events and attend a fundraiser held by True Patriot Love Foundation.
2026	7 August	The Duke and Duchess of Sussex	British Columbia: Victoria	To attend the David Foster Foundation's 40th-anniversary celebration.
2026	25 September	The Duke of Sussex	Ontario: Cookstown	To take part in a charity skydive, raising funds for Sunnybrook and True Patriot Love Foundation.
2026	2 October	The Duke of Edinburgh	Ontario: Toronto	To promote the Duke of Edinburgh's International Award.

== See also ==
- Royal tours of Canada
- List of royal tours of Canada (18th-20th centuries)
- List of state and official visits by Canada
