= 2022 royal tour of Canada =

2022 visit by the Prince of Wales and the Duchess of Cornwall

The 2022 royal tour of Canada by Charles, Prince of Wales and Camilla, Duchess of Cornwall, took place from 17 to 19 May 2022, as part of the Canadian celebrations of the Queen's Platinum Jubilee. During the three-day tour, the couple visited communities throughout Newfoundland and Labrador, the National Capital Region, and the Northwest Territories. Also, the tour had a special focus on reconciliation with Indigenous peoples, which the Prince framed as a "vital process".

== Background ==
Ahead of their visit, the Prince of Wales and the Duchess of Cornwall visited Canada House in London on 12 May. The couple viewed art on display from the Shenkman Indigenous Art Collection, met members of the Canadian diaspora, and watched a small performance.

Canadian High Commissioner to the United Kingdom Ralph Goodale said that the Crown and Canada have a "very egalitarian" relationship. He said it is not about empire, but Commonwealth, and the relationship "constantly reviews itself in modern terms, and that is the secret of its longevity".

== Tour ==
=== Newfoundland and Labrador ===
I have greatly appreciated the opportunity to discuss with the Governor General the vital process of reconciliation in this country – not a one-off act, of course, but an ongoing commitment to healing, respect and understanding. I know that our visit here this week comes at an important moment – with indigenous and non-indigenous peoples across Canada committing to reflect honestly and openly on the past and to forge a new relationship for the future...

— Charles, Prince of Wales, 2022

The couple arrived in St. John's, Newfoundland and Labrador, in the afternoon of 17 May, and were later welcomed at Confederation Building. Prayers were held in Inuktitut, followed by Miꞌkmaq music, and performances showcasing the province's tradition of song and story took place. In his speech, the Prince discussed Indigenous reconciliation, and said that the visit comes at an "important moment", with "Indigenous and non-Indigenous peoples across Canada committing to reflect honestly and openly on the past, and to forge a new relationship for the future". Prime Minister Justin Trudeau reflected on the relationship between the Crown and Canada: "So much of the endurance and stability of our democracy is woven into our Westminster parliamentary system, our constitutional monarchy and the Crown".

The Prince and the Duchess then visited Government House, where they participated in a solemn moment of reflection and prayer at the Heart Garden, that was unveiled in 2019 in memory of the victims of residential schools. The couple were joined by Lieutenant Governor Judy Foote and Indigenous leaders and community members at the ceremony. Elisabeth Penashue, a 78-year-old elder from Sheshatshiu Innu First Nation in Labrador, said it was "really important they hear our stories".

Later, the Prince met representatives of Campaign for Wool Canada, and engaged with NONIA knitters. On the grounds of Government House, the couple unveiled a bronze marker at the start of the new Commonwealth Walkway, a Platinum Jubilee commemorative project.

The Prince and the Duchess then visited Quidi Vidi Village, a fishing village located in the east end of St. John's. Here, they visited the Quidi Vidi Village Artisan Studios, and met talented makers and participated in a collective work of rug-hooking. They undertook a walkabout of The Wharf, and then visited the Quidi Vidi Brewery, a local micro-brewery, where they learnt about the brewing process, and met representatives of Newfoundland and Labrador's emerging culinary and food scene. The couple also had beer, and the Duchess remarked that it was "very good".

The Prince and the Duchess later arrived in Ottawa in the evening of 17 May.

=== National Capital Region ===
In the morning of 18 May, the Prince of Wales was invested as an Extraordinary Commander of the Order of Military Merit by the governor general, at a ceremony at Rideau Hall, which also marked the 50th anniversary of the Order.

Later, the couple participated in a wreath laying ceremony at the National War Memorial, to honour Canadian veterans and active service members. After the ceremony, the Prince and the Duchess met members and organisations from the Canadian Ukrainian community, and learn about Canada's efforts to support the people of Ukraine. They attended a traditional prayer service at the Assumption of the Blessed Virgin Ukrainian Orthodox Cathedral in Ottawa's west end. They also learnt about Ukrainian culture and met representatives from the Ukrainian Canadian Congress.

Later, the couple visited ByWard Market and Assumption Elementary School. At the Royal Canadian Mounted Police Stables, the Prince and the Duchess viewed the Musical Ride. At Birds Foundation, the couple engaged with young women who have settled in Canada after fleeing the recent conflict in Afghanistan, and representatives of the 30 Birds Foundation program that helped their resettlement. Later, the Prince participated in discussions on employment and sustainability with the Prince's Trust Canada program participants.

At Rideau Hall, the Prince held a bilateral meetings with Prime Minister Justin Trudeau and Governor General Mary Simon, and also interacted with Canadian stakeholders on the importance of sustainable finance in combating climate change and building a net-zero economy. The day ended with a Platinum Jubilee reception at Rideau Hall hosted by the governor general. At the reception, the Prince and the Duchess met Canadians from various backgrounds who are serving their communities. RoseAnne Archibald, National Chief of the Assembly of First Nations, appealed directly to the Prince and asked for an apology from the Queen in her capacity as monarch and head of the Church of England for the wrongful acts committed in the past by the Crown and the church in relation to Indigenous peoples. She said that the Prince "acknowledged" failures by Canadian governments in handling the relationship between the Crown and indigenous people, which she said "really meant something".

=== Northwest Territories ===
During this Jubilee visit we have again been reminded of everything that makes Canada so special – not least the vastness and magnificence of the country that you share; the diversity, compassion and inclusivity which you embody. We have once more felt the extraordinary generosity of spirit for which the Northwest Territories – and, indeed, Canada as a whole – are so rightly known throughout the world.

— Charles, Prince of Wales, 2022

On 19 May, the couple arrived in Northwest Territories, and were received by Yellowknife Mayor Rebecca Alty and Northwest Territories Commissioner Margaret Thom. In Dettah, the Prince and the Duchess visited a Dene First Nation community, and participated in an opening prayer, a drumming circle and a feeding the fire ceremony, which saw them put offerings of tobacco into the fire.

In the Council Chambers of Chief Drygeese Government Building, the Prince held discussions with Elder Bernadette Martin, Chief Edward Sangris and Chief Fred Sangris for a Round table with Yellowknives Dene First Nation Leadership. Meanwhile the Duchess visited Kaw Tay Whee School to learn about the school's efforts to preserve their language.

Later, the Prince visited Fred Henne Territorial Park, where he met members of the Canadian Rangers to mark their 75th anniversary. The prince briefly sat atop a snowmobile, and was shown different animal furs, drums and weapons. Afterwards, he visited the Rotary Centennial Park, Yellowknife, to discuss the impact of climate change. The Duchess of Cornwall visited a YWCA transitional housing centre for women and children. At the Prince of Wales Northern Heritage Centre, the Prince met local food producers to discuss entrepreneurship in the context of the pandemic. The Prince also participated in a discussion on Treaty 11, its history and its legacy in the Northwest Territories, and the couple observed a demonstration of traditional Inuit sports.

Later, the Prince and the Duchess marked the Platinum Jubilee at the Ceremonial Circle with a Jubilee flag raising, and unveiling a plaque, followed by a presentation of various plants and flowers that will be included in the Northwest Territories' Platinum Jubilee Garden.

== See also ==
- The Canadian Crown and Indigenous peoples of Canada
- Royal tours of Canada
- List of royal tours of Canada (18th–20th centuries)
- List of royal tours of Canada (21st century)
- 2002 royal tour of Canada
- 2011 royal tour of Canada
