= 2011 royal tour of Canada =

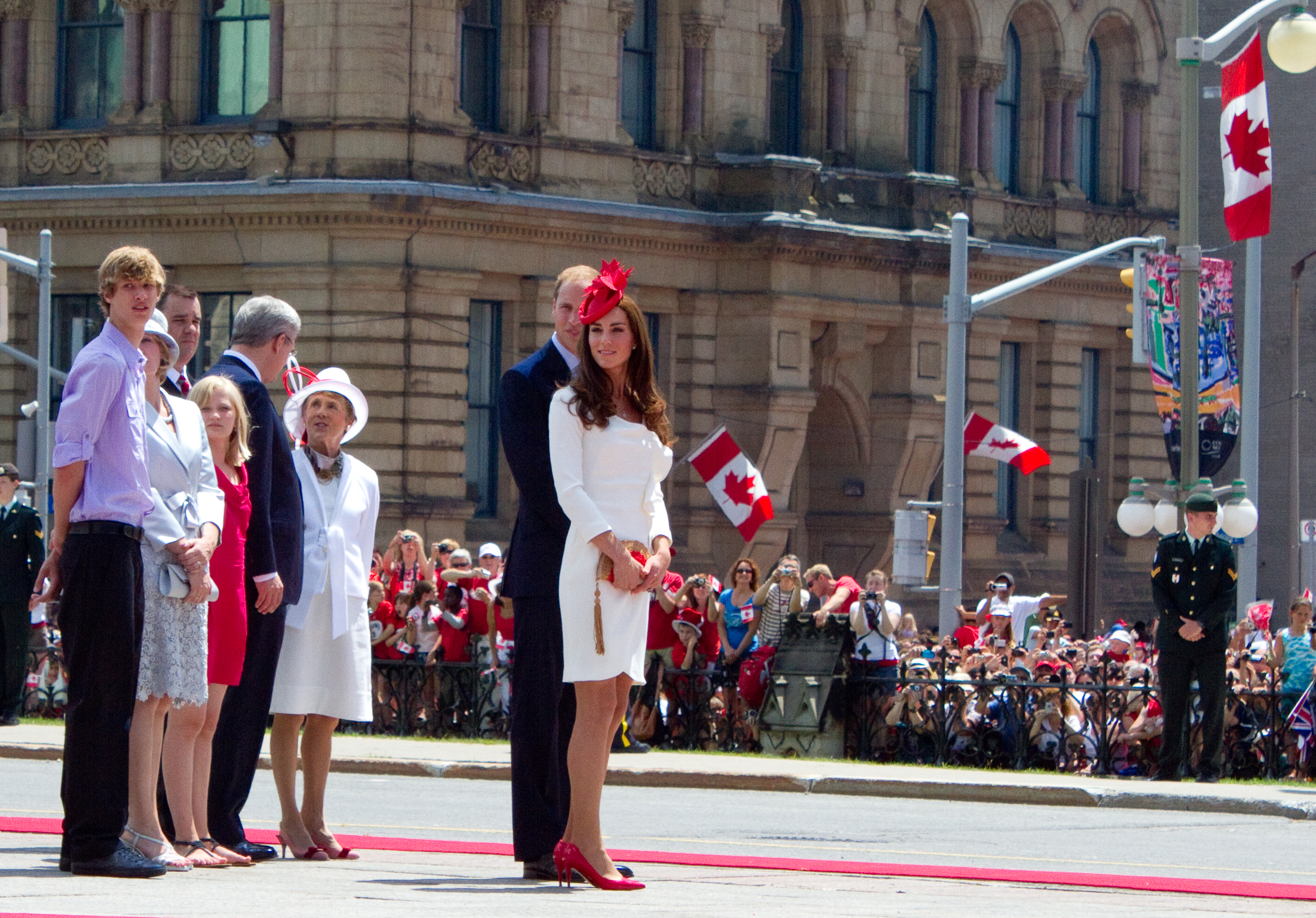
Prince William and Catherine, the Duke and Duchess of Cambridge, during Canada Day celebrations at Parliament Hill on 1 July 2011

The 2011 Royal Tour of Canada was undertaken by Prince William, and Catherine, the Duke and Duchess of Cambridge, between 30 June and 8 July 2011. The tour saw the newlywed couple visit all of Canada's regions. It was the first such tour undertaken by the Duke and Duchess since their marriage two months prior, and the first duties the couple carried out as members of the Canadian Royal Family. The tour was followed by more than 1,300 accredited media. It included the first use of the Duke of Cambridge's royal standard for Canada, the first Canadian citizenship ceremony attended by royalty, Canada Day ceremonies attended by approximately 800,000 people, and many smaller events across the country.

== Background ==
The tour fell on the 225th anniversary of the first royal visit to Canada, by the then Prince William (later King William IV), as part of a naval contingent.

The tour was organised by Kevin S. MacLeod, Canadian Secretary to the Queen, who has organised every royal visit to Canada since 1987. Tour organization took only three months instead of the usual 12. The couple travelled with a pared-down entourage of seven, including British police that have no jurisdiction in Canada. MacLeod let them make the tour much less formal than some previous. The inclusion of Prince Edward Island, at the apparent request of Catherine, stands in contrast to previous tours. The 1983 tour of Canada by Prince Charles and newly-wed Diana reflected his interests, as well as Canadian priorities, but none of Diana's own interests.

1,300 journalists were accredited for this tour, including 241 foreign ones. The tour included a chartered plane to PEI. British news outlet ITN filmed a documentary on the tour.

== Tour ==
The royal tour took place from 30 June to 8 July 2011.

During the tour, Catherine had made a point of wearing Canadian fashion designers at various points throughout the trip. Departing from Britain, she wore a navy blue blazer by Toronto-based Smythe les Vestes, On arrival, her outfit was by Montreal designer Erdem Moralioglu. Even when wearing foreign designers, as on Canada Day, the white-dress outfit had domestic influences such a red hat with fabric maple leaves, and Queen Elizabeth II's maple leaf brooch first worn during her 1951 tour of Canada. CBS News royal contributor Victoria Arbiter suggested Catherine might wear 40 outfits on the trip.

=== Ontario and Quebec ===
==== National Capital Region ====
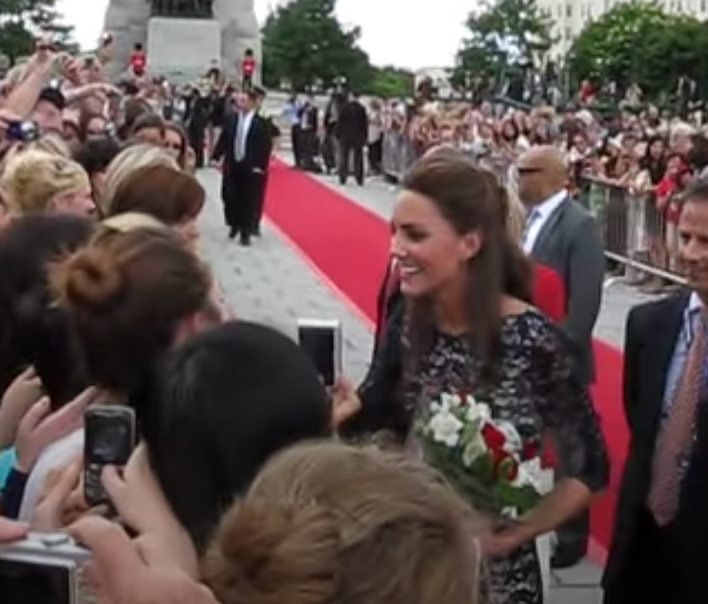
Catherine at the Canadian National War Memorial on 30 June

On Thursday, 30 June, the couple departed Britain for Canada, travelling on a Canadian military plane. Upon landing at Macdonald-Cartier International Airport on Thursday, 30 June, the cockpit showed the Duke of Cambridge's Personal Canadian Flag; the newly adopted flag was previewed only the day before by Canadian federal government officials. Among the dignitaries greeting the couple were John Baird, Canadian Minister of Foreign Affairs, David McGuinty, Ottawa South MP, William JS Elliott, Commissioner of the Royal Canadian Mounted Police, and Jim Watson, Mayor of Ottawa.

The couple proceeded to a wreath laying at the Canadian Tomb of the Unknown Soldier, at the Canadian National War Memorial, their first public event as a couple since the wedding. After meeting with veterans, their first walkabout as a couple was considered unhurried, as they were 10 minutes late for their next appearance.

The Duke and Duchess then headed to Rideau Hall, residence of the Governor General of Canada, for their official Welcome to Canada and Ottawa Ceremony by Governor General David Johnston; attendance turnout was around 6,000 people, double the turnout of people at the War Memorial. The Duke inspected the Guard of Honour, including the Army, the Air Force and the Navy. The Royal Salute, composed by Edward VIII, played on bagpipes. The event was followed with a Celebration of Youth Barbecue Reception at Rideau Hall.

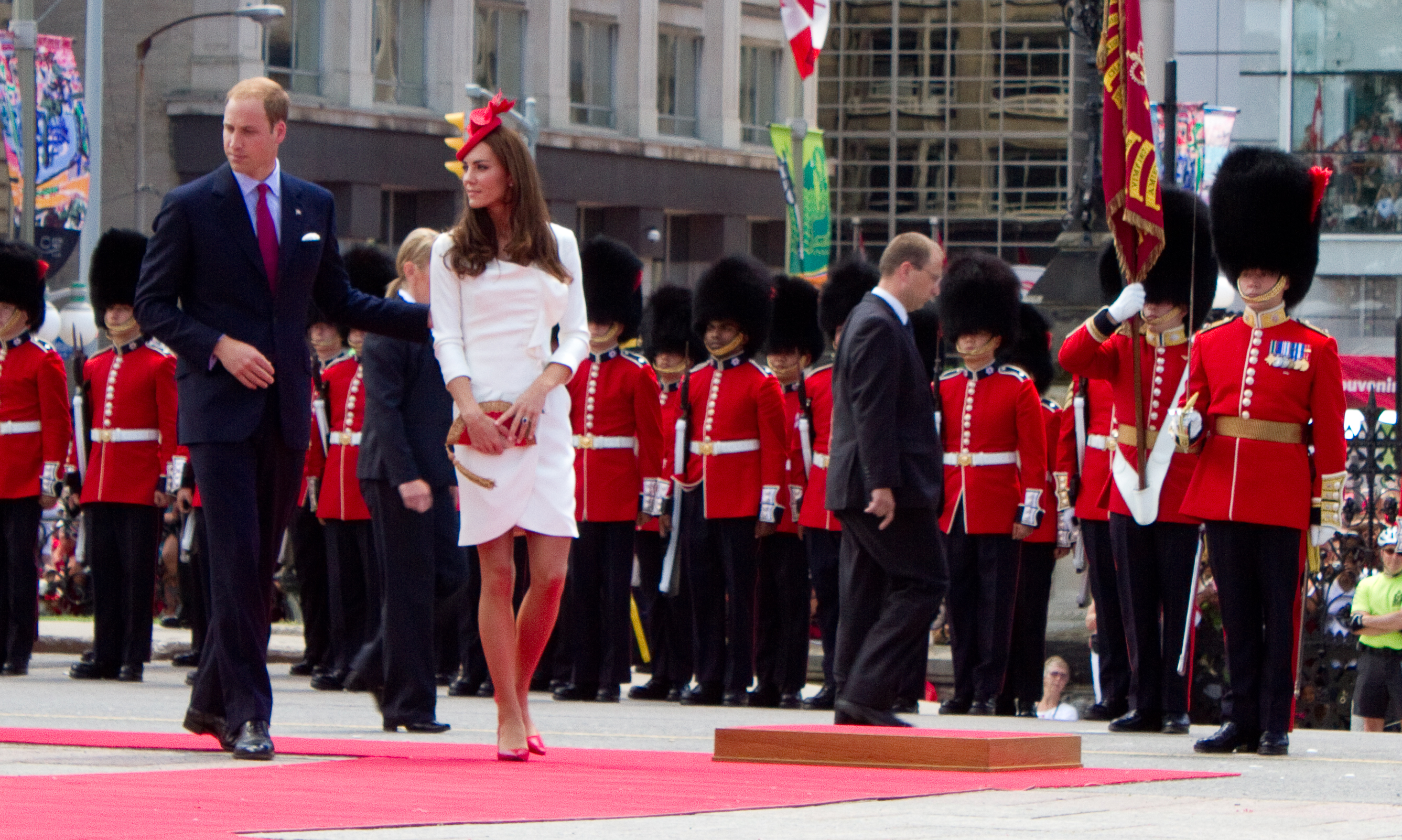
The Duke and Duchess with the guard of honour during Canada Day celebrations at Parliament Hill

On Canada Day, 1 July, on what would have been the late Princess Diana's 50th birthday, the couple attended a citizenship ceremony at the Canadian Museum of Civilization; this was the first time that members of the Royal Family participated in a Canadian citizenship ceremony. Pipe Major of The Sons of Scotland played as they entered the ceremony to a tune which was "St. Andrews Courtship", a work by Pipe Major Bethany Bisaillion, created for them. The event attracted protesters who strummed guitars and wave placards outside event, in protest of mandatory pledging allegiance to the Queen. This was followed by the Canada Day Parliament Hill Noon Show, a public event, arriving in the State Landau. Performers included the Sam Roberts Band, Great Big Sea, Corb Lund, and Maria Aragon. The show was broadcast on CBC Television and radio in English and French. The couple returned in the evening for additional performances, and fireworks; this was considered a significant security risk.

The couple began 2 July at the Canadian War Museum, unveiling the mural "The Canadians Opposite Lens" by Augustus John. From there, the couple proceeded to Montreal, Quebec's Montréal-Pierre Elliott Trudeau International Airport.

==== Quebec ====
Outside their first stop, Sainte-Justine University Hospital Centre, Reseau de Resistance du Québécois (RRQ) protesters' bilingual placards called the couple "parasites". Onlookers and well-wishers outnumbered the protesters "10 to 1", according to media reports. The RRQ had hired 40 security guards to keep their protesters in check. The Duke and Duchess visited the hospital to meet with patients and their families.

The couple received cooking classes at l'Institut de tourisme et d'hôtellerie du Québec. The Mouvement pacifique pour l'indépendance du Québec was planning to protest the visit by dressing in peasant costumes, outside the institute. Upon their arrival at the Institut, the couple was greeted by approximately 500 fans and protesters. Jean Charest, the premier of Quebec, and his wife accompanied the couple in the class. The two couples had supper together after the short workshop.

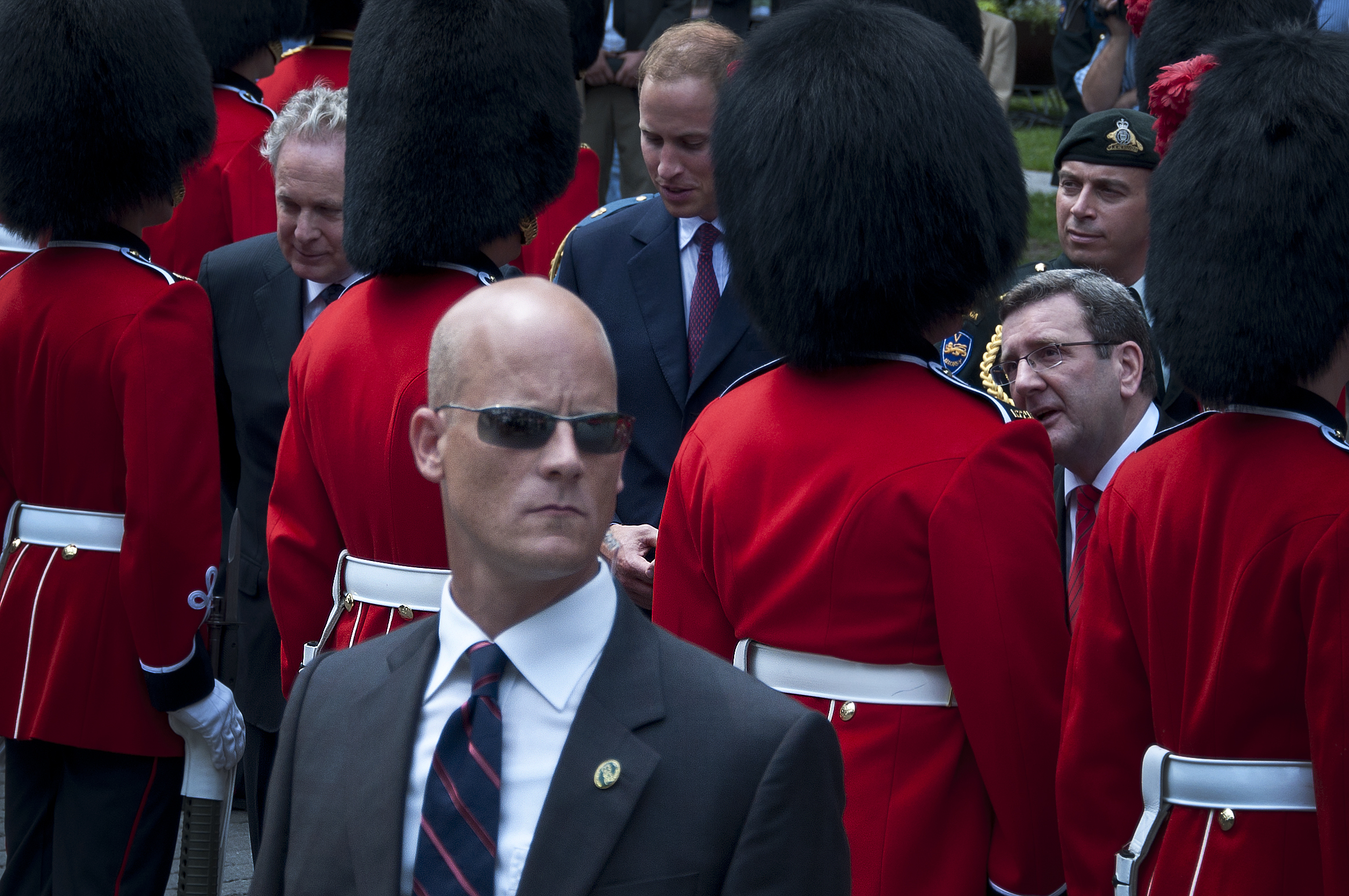
The Duke and the premier of Quebec, Jean Charest, inspects the Royal 22^{e} Regiment in Quebec City

The couple departed from Montreal for Quebec City at 9:55 pm, on HMCS Montréal.

After saying Morning Prayer with the crew of HMCS Montréal, the ship docked at Quebec City, Quebec. Crowds gathered on the boardwalk to Chateau Frontenac, and along to the Plains of Abraham. The couple then toured la Maison Dauphine, an organization which serves street youth, where they had a private conversation with a small group, to here the youth's stories.

The first public event of the day was just after noon, a Freedom of the City Ceremony at the Quebec City Hall (Hôtel de ville de Québec). William's speech, delivered entirely in French, included "You, the Québécois and Québécoise, have such vitality and vigour. It is simply a pleasure to be here." Sovereigntist group Réseau de Résistance du Québécois expected 300 protesters for their demonstration outside City Hall; media reported about 200 showed up. Protesters noted that they did have a plane fly over the city hall with a separatist banner.

The next public event was at a community celebration in Lévis, Quebec, touring the Fort Numéro Un de Lévis. From there, they went to Charlottetown, Prince Edward Island for the evening.

=== Prince Edward Island ===
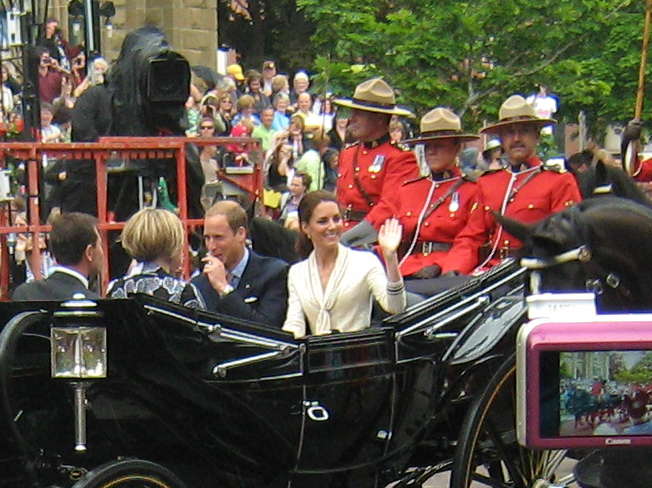
The couple driven in a carriage surrounded by the Royal Canadian Mounted Police in Charlottetown

After visiting Province House, PEI's provincial legislature at Charlottetown, the couple learned of Canadian military accomplishments in Prince Edward Island National Park, before William took part in "a training session for the 'waterbird' emergency landing procedure in a Sea King helicopter at Dalvay-by-the-Sea." The day was a rainy one. At the hotel, a National Historic Site of Canada, the couple was welcomed to PEI by a traditional Miqmah smudging ceremony, where they sampled several kinds of local foods. Aboriginal, Acadian and Celtic cultural and culinary traditions. The couple then challenged each other to a dragon boat race. William's team won by half a length. Then on Dalvay Beach the couple chatted with beach volleyball players, sand castle builders and baked-lobster chefs. The final public event of the day was in Summerside, where the couple watched a Search and Rescue exercise at Summerside Harbour with the Canadian Coast Guard. The couple then flew to Yellowknife Airport, Yellowknife, Northwest Territories arriving early in the evening.

Local actors playing characters Anne Shirley and Matthew Cuthbert (Tess Benger and Kris Tusler) in Anne of Green Gables: The Musical appeared as guests. The province was Catherine's choice for the tour.

=== Northwest Territories ===
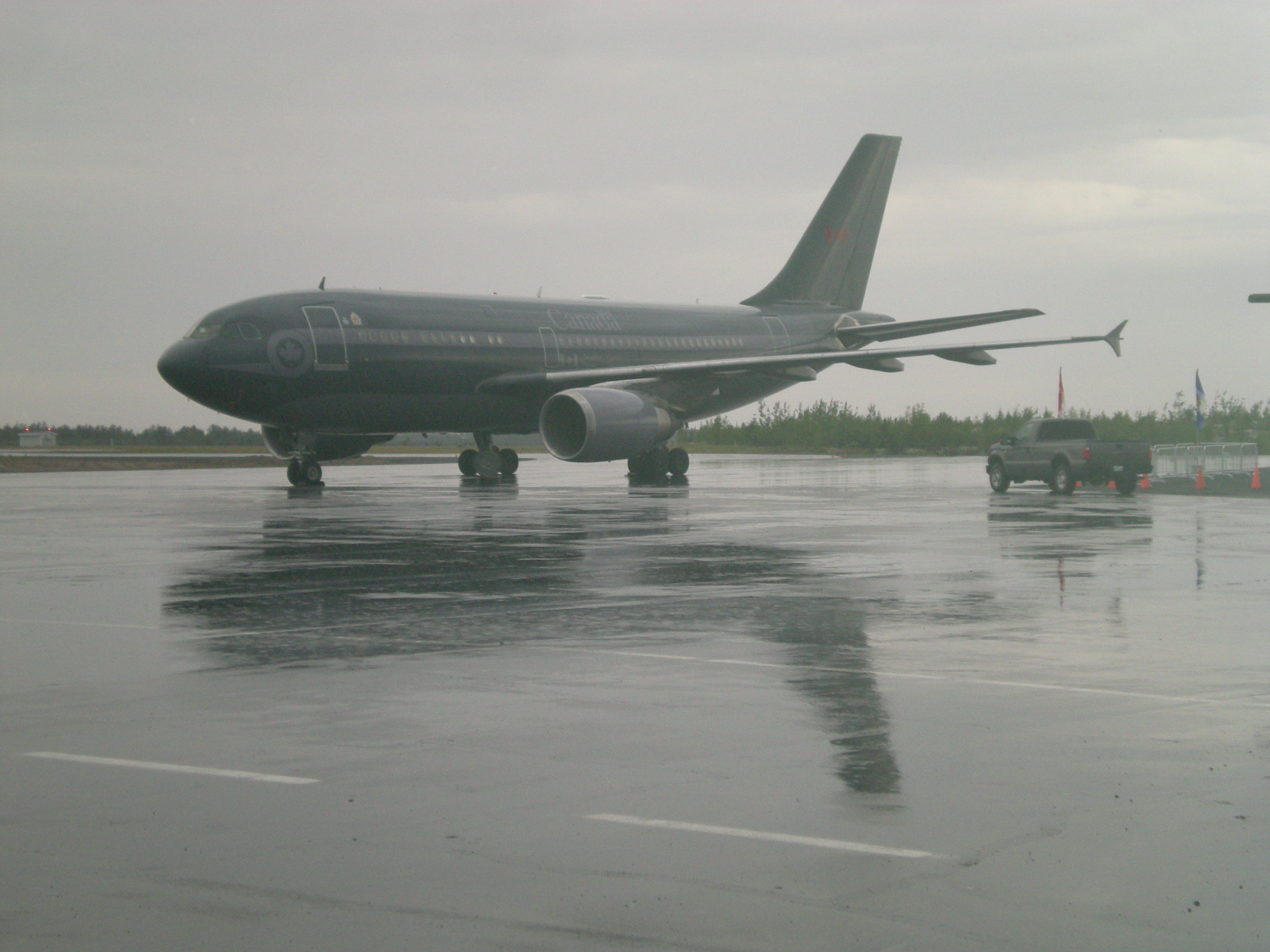
The Airbus CC-150 Polaris at Yellowknife Airport that was used to transport the Duke and Duchess

At 11:40 am, Tuesday, 5 July, the couple participated in a public event, an Official Arrival to the Northwest Territories. William and Catherine arrived at Somba K'e Civic Plaza to take part in Aboriginal traditions and activities, including traditional drumming, dancing and sports. The ceremony was to highlight the historic and continuing cooperation between the Northwest Territories' Aboriginal peoples and residents of other cultures. The Duke's speech included the phrase "thank you" in both the Na-Dene and Inuvialuktun languages. In a street hockey game, Prince William took three shots on goal, but the young goaltender kept him from scoring.

A session of the Youth Parliament at the Legislative Assembly was followed by a visit to Blachford Lake, which included the First Canadian Ranger Patrol Group and Dechinta: Bush University Centre for Research and Learning.

=== Alberta ===
The original public schedule for Wednesday, 6 July was listed as a day off for the royal couple. The unannounced stop was made in Slave Lake, Alberta, where the royal couple toured the town that was partially destroyed by a wildfire in May. Arriving at the town's airport, the couple met with Alberta Premier Ed Stelmach and the Mayor of Slave Lake, Karina Pillay-Kinnee. They met with emergency services personnel from the fire department, the Royal Canadian Mounted Police and the medical response team at Northern Lakes College. At the gym of Northern Lakes College, the couple met with some of the families affected by the fire. The town was in the midst of dealing with flooding of Sawridge Creek. At 1:30 pm, they went back to the Slave Lake Airport and continued on their way to Calgary. They spent the night at the private Skoki Ski Lodge, a National Historic Site near Lake Louise, within the Rocky Mountain-area Banff National Park. Much of the press coverage for this part of the tour discussed the remoteness of the site, which includes only outhouses. No official comment was made on whether it was retrofitted, at least temporarily.

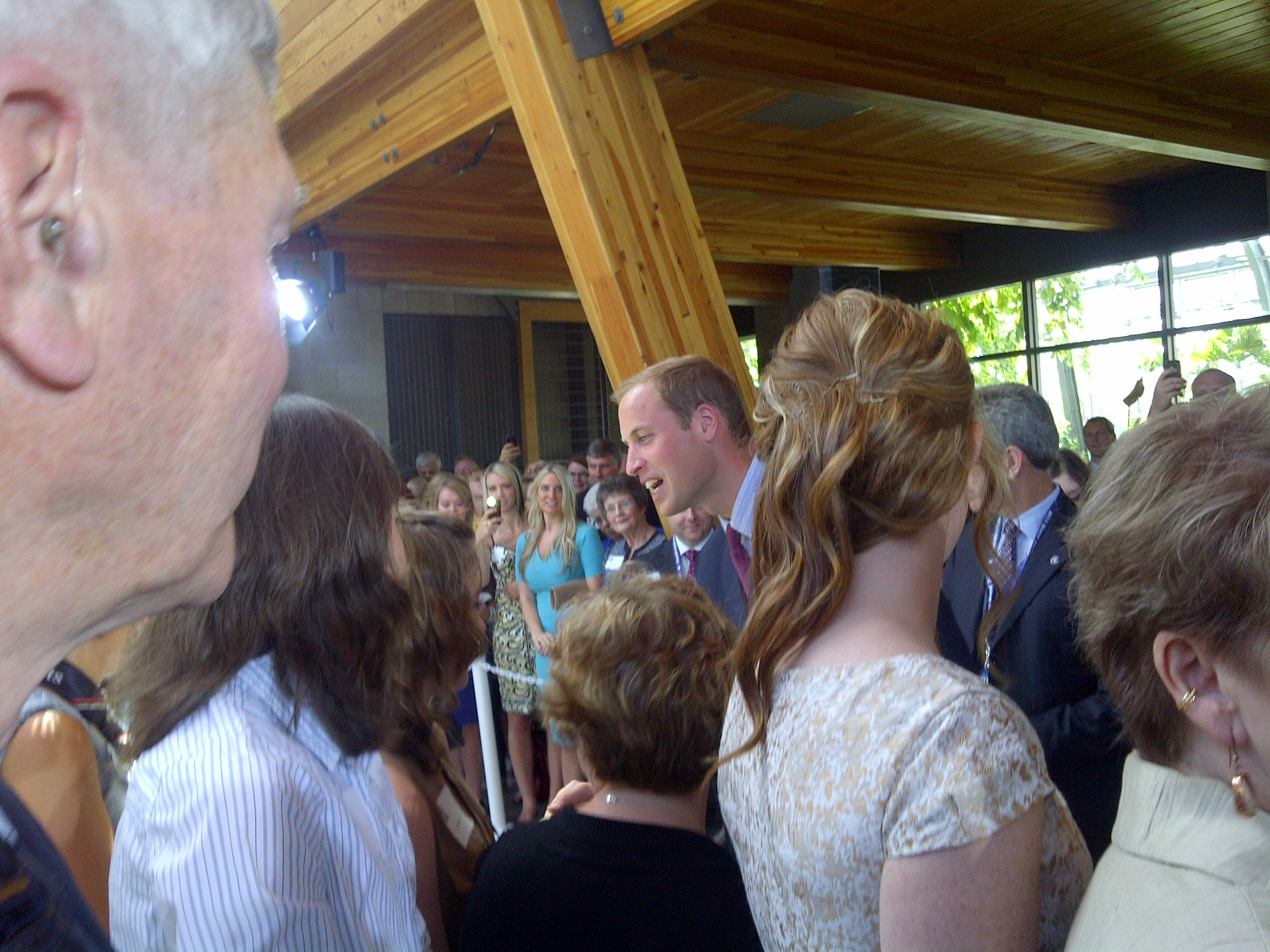
Prince William during his visit to Calgary on 8 July

Arriving in Calgary in the afternoon, at Calgary International Airport, the Duke and Duchess were presented with the usual headgear in the White Hat Ceremony, but didn't wear them. They toured the University of Calgary Ward of the 21st Century Research and Innovation Centre (W21C), and attended an evening Government of Canada reception at the BMO Stampede Park. The latter included the creation of the Duke and Duchess of Cambridge's Parks Canada Youth Ambassadors Program. The city gave free wristbands to public events, to lessen the volume of people.

The first event of the Friday, 8 July, was the day for the couple to launch the Calgary Stampede Parade at Bow Valley College. The parade is run by the same organization as the top-level rodeo event itself. The parade attracted a record crowd of 425,000 people.

The Vancouver Humane Society, the League Against Cruel Sports, and Fight Against Animal Cruelty had all asked that the royal couple not visit the Stampede, deeming it animal cruelty; People for the Ethical Treatment of Animals (PETA) suggested that they were approaching a "hotbed of controversy". If they don't cancel the event, PETA called on locals to protest at the event. The stampede has often attracted animal rights activists, on years without special guests. A horse died of a leg injury in the Stampede's first night, in spite of an "extensive overhaul to its animal care standards".

Barred from attending the 2010 Stampede parade, attempts to block street preacher Art Pawlowski were unsuccessful. He planned to have his group march following the parade proper, or set up a protest. There were no reports on whether he followed through.

Later events included a reception at the ENMAX Conservatory, Calgary Zoo, hosted by the Alberta Government, and a public Official Departure Ceremony. Finally, after a nine-day Canadian tour that "far exceeded" expectations, according to Prince William, and was by all accounts a huge success, the Duke and Duchess of Cambridge boarded a Royal Canadian Air Force aircraft, and departed the Realm, their last stop in North America being a visit to Los Angeles, California.

== Post-tour ==
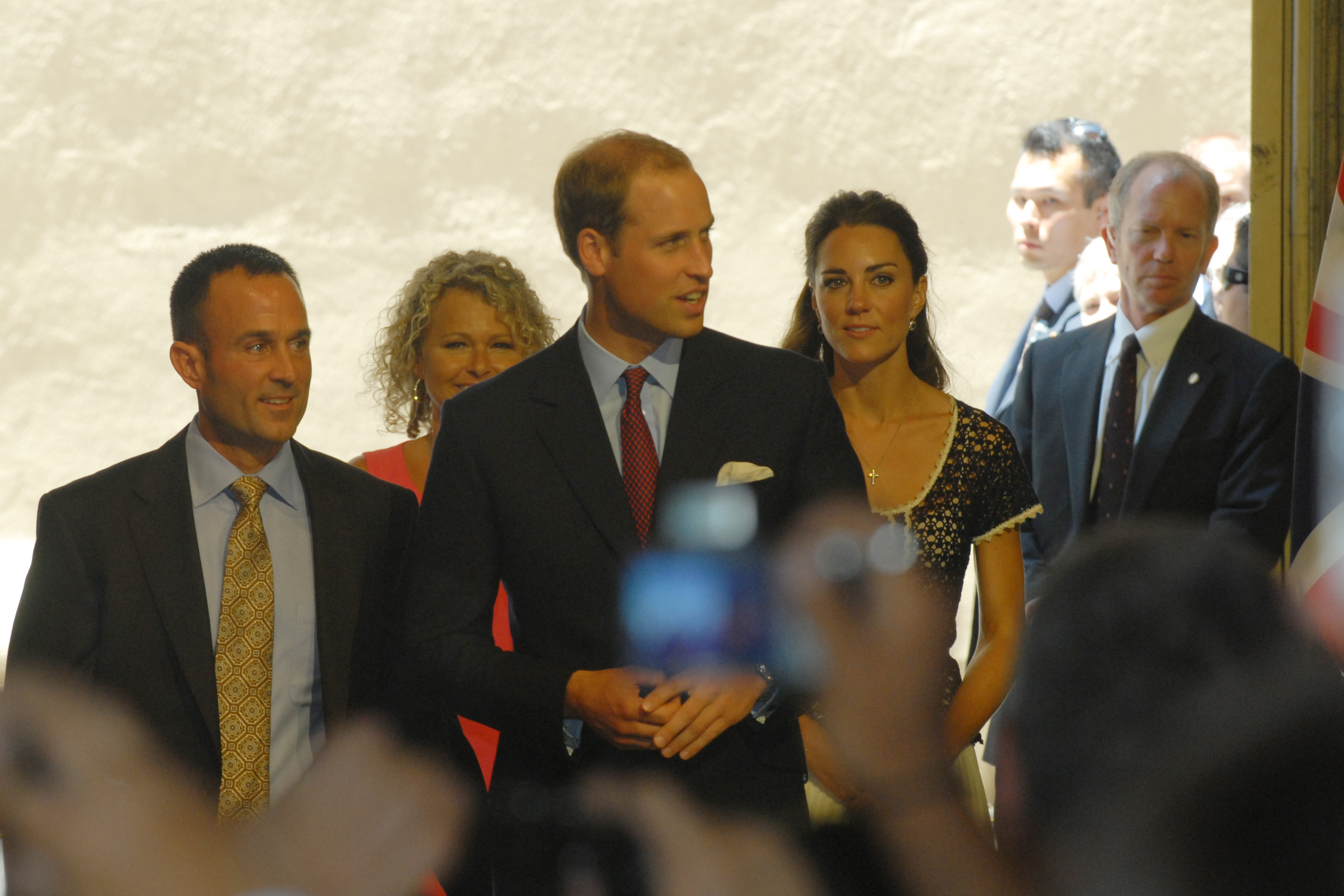
The Duke and Duchess at the Sony Pictures Studios on 10 July. The couple departed for California at the conclusion of their 9-day long Canadian tour.

The Duke and Duchess of Cambridge departed Canada on 8 July, aboard a Canadian Forces jet bound for Los Angeles, US. Upon arrival in the Californian city they were greeted by Canadian Consul General David Fransen, California Governor Jerry Brown and Los Angeles Mayor Antonio Villaraigosa. Being greeted by the Canadian Consul-General first, Prince William had, according to the CBC, departed as a prince of Canada rather than a foreign prince. On 9 July, the couple attended the inaugural BAFTA Brits to Watch event at the downtown Belasco Theater.

== Reception ==
A poll conducted before the tour showed 54% of those between 18 and 34 who were polled were indifferent to the tour.

Public events during the tour drew big crowds. On Canada Day at Parliament Hill, attendance was 300,000 in the morning, and a half-million in the evening. The National Capital Commission had speculated half a million would show up at the morning event.

The Canadian tour become a subject of controversy, as the royal couple planned to attend the annual Calgary Stampede, an event that features steer busting and calf roping and is condemned by animal welfare experts. The rodeo was banned in the United Kingdom in 1934. Animal Rights groups from Britain and Canada have written to Clarence House urging the couple not to attend the event.

The tour attracted small crowds and protests in the province of Quebec. Quebec MNA Amir Khadir, a leader of the leftist party Québec solidaire, referred to the royal couple as "parasites" ahead of the visit, calling the tour "a waste of public funds". In Montreal they were met by approximately 500 supporters and 100 protesters and in Quebec City they were met by several hundred supporters and about 200 protesters, some wearing black and waving flags.

== See also ==
- Royal tours of Canada
- List of royal tours of Canada (18th–20th centuries)
- List of royal tours of Canada (21st century)
- 2002 royal tour of Canada
- 2022 royal tour of Canada
