= Dalvay-by-the-Sea =

National Historic Site of Canada in Prince Edward Island National Park

Coordinates: 46.414856°N 63.073336°W

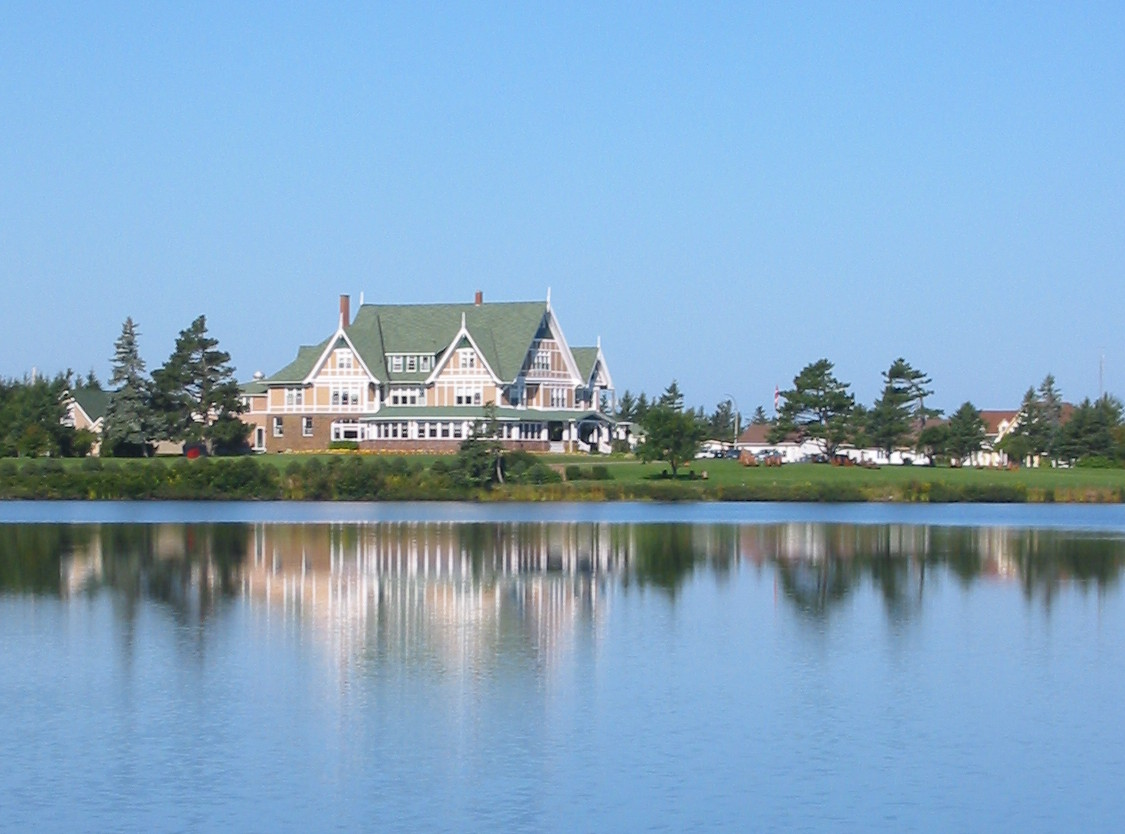
Dalvay-by-the-Sea Hotel is a National Historic Site located on the north shore of Prince Edward Island.

Dalvay-by-the-Sea is a National Historic Site of Canada located on the north shore of Prince Edward Island at the eastern end of Prince Edward Island National Park. The most significant feature of Dalvay is the Queen Anne Revival style hotel, originally constructed as a home for an American industrialist.

The hotel is a popular attraction for visitors to Prince Edward Island and has been featured in the Anne of Green Gables movies. The venue also served as the fictional White Sands Hotel in the Canadian Road to Avonlea television series.

Prince William, Duke of Cambridge, and Catherine, Duchess of Cambridge visited Dalvay-by-the-Sea during their 2011 royal tour of Canada. William took part in training exercises with the Canadian Forces, executing a "water bird" emergency landing procedure over Dalvay Lake in a Sea King helicopter. Later in the day, the royal couple competed against each other in a dragon boat race on Dalvay Lake.

== Alexander Macdonald house ==
In 1895, a wealthy Scots-born American industrialist, Alexander Macdonald, discovered the area while on vacation on Prince Edward Island. He and his wife became so enamored of the area that Macdonald purchased 120 acres (0.49 km^{2}) of land and commissioned a house to be built here. The house was completed in 1896. Macdonald named it Dalvay-by-the-Sea after his boyhood home in Scotland.

Construction costs were approximately $50,000 (equivalent to $1,935,000 in 2025). The lower half of the house was constructed of Island sandstone in its natural form. The huge fireplaces were also made of sandstone. The furnishings were purchased from all over the world during family travels in England, France, Italy, and Egypt. Some pieces were also purchased in Charlottetown. Water and power were supplied by a series of windmills.

The MacDonalds kept a number of servants, including grooms to look after the many horses and carriages owned by the family. It cost about $10,000 a year to operate. The family entertained frequently over the summer, and at the end of every summer hosted a lavish dance for the locals.

The MacDonalds enjoyed the house for over a decade, but by 1909 he was not in good health. At the end of that summer, he stood for the last time at Long Pond gazing at his house before quietly saying, "Good-bye Dalvay". He died in Long Beach, California in 1910.

After his death, the property was left to MacDonald's granddaughters. Since they were underage at the time, it was managed by their father, Edmund Stallo. Due to bad investments, the $15 million Alexander fortune dwindled to nothing and the estate had to be sold. The property itself was tended by William Hughes since the death of Alexander. When he contacted the family to ask what should be done with the place, they told him he could have it for the back taxes. Hughes bought the house and furnishings for $486.57. He had no interest in keeping it, so sold it to William O'Leary of Montreal. The O'Leary's removed most of the furniture and eventually it was sold to Captain Edward Dicks. Dicks renovated the house, intending to turn it into a hotel. However, he ran out of money. In time, George DeBlois acquired the property.

In 1938, DeBlois sold the house and land to the Government of Canada. Since then, the house has been operated as a hotel by operators under a leased concession from Parks Canada. There are 26 guest rooms, furnished in period antiques.
