= Commonwealth Study Conference =

The first Commonwealth Study Conference held in Oxford, United Kingdom in 1956 to study the human aspects of industrial issues across Commonwealth countries. The founder of the conference, Prince Philip, Duke of Edinburgh, described it as "an extraordinary experiment" that provided an opportunity for people from all over the Commonwealth and all walks of life to leave their usual roles and, with a diverse group of people, examine the relationship between industry and the community around it.

The participants are drawn from all sectors of society and particularly included people from government bodies, non-governmental organizations (NGOS), trade unions and businesses. On average 300 people attend such a conference.

Since 1956 ten separate Commonwealth Study Conferences have taken place, variously hosted in Canada, Australia, New Zealand, India, Malaysia and the United Kingdom. A number of related Regional conferences have also been held.

== History ==
In 2006 a comprehensive 204 page book Leadership In The Making was published in Canada, celebrating 50 years since the first conference in 1956. Prince Philip described how the idea came about:

"The idea for the conference arose as a result of my visit to Canada in 1954. I had asked to visit some of the new and developing industries in Canada's far north on the way home from the Commonwealth Games in Vancouver.

"Two things struck me. The great majority of these developments were 'single-industry' enterprises, and in most cases the towns associated with the industries were 'company towns'. This is not typical for an industrialised country, but it had the effect of drawing my attention to one of the basic problems faced by industrial communities. While a company in control of an industrial enterprise has to be based on a system of managerial and technical qualifications, the town in which all the workers and the management have to live needs to be managed by some democratic system involving all the inhabitants as citizens.

"The purpose of the conference was to look into the tensions, problems and opportunities created by this dichotomy between industrial enterprise and community development."
