= List of royal tours of Canada (18th–20th centuries) =

There was an extended royal presence in Canada through the 18th, 19th, and 20th centuries, either as an official tour, a vacation, a period of military service, or a viceregal posting by a member of the Royal Family. Originally, royal tours of Canada were events predominantly for Canadians to see and possibly meet members of their Royal Family, with the associated patriotic pomp and spectacle. However, nearing the end of the 20th century, such occasions took on the added dimension of a theme, and junior members of the Royal Family began to undertake unofficial "working" tours of Canada as well; in this method, royal figures are invited by provinces, municipalities, and other organizations to events which the latter fund without assistance from the federal government. The Prince of Wales, The Princess Royal, The Duke of York and The Prince Edward, have all made several small tours in this fashion. These arrangements then continued on into the 21st century.

== 18th century ==
Years	People	Locations	Reasons
1786 – 1787	The Prince William (later William IV)	Maritimes; Province of Quebec: Quebec City	As part of a Royal Navy contingent.
1791 – 1800	The Prince Edward (Duke of Kent from 1799)	Nova Scotia: Halifax; Province of Quebec (Lower Canada after 1791)	Served as Commander-in-Chief of North America.

== 19th century ==
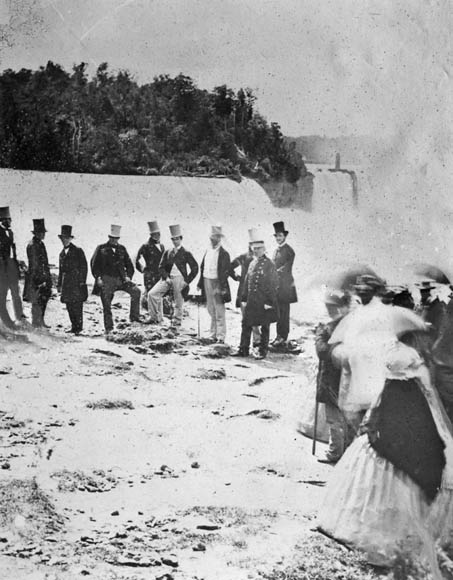
The Prince of Wales visiting Niagara Falls in 1860.

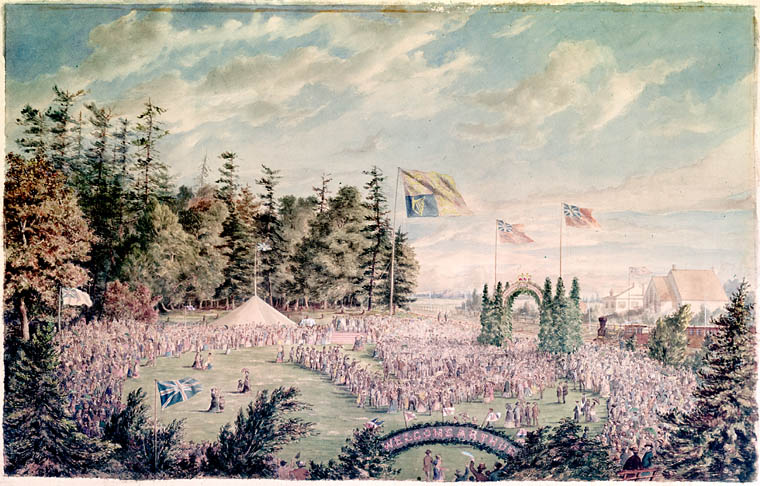
The Prince Arthur arrives to turn the sod for the Toronto, Grey and Bruce Railway, 1869.

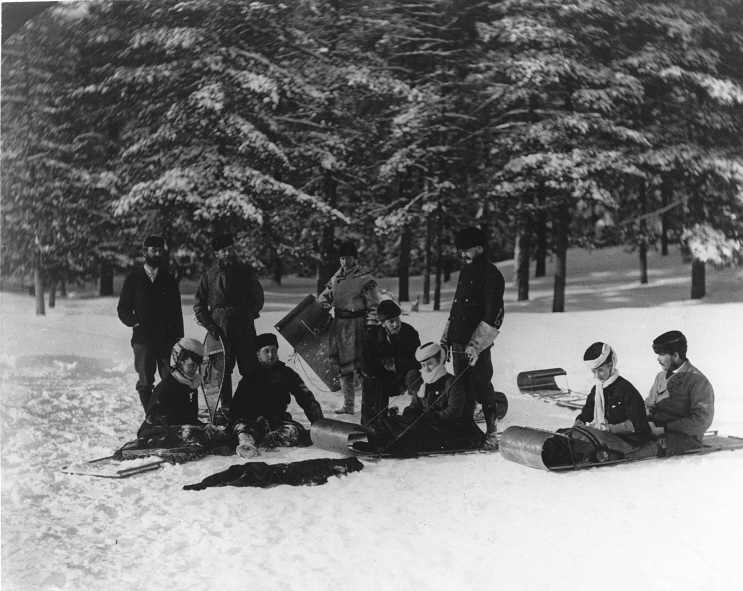
The Prince Arthur sledding in Ottawa, 1870.

Years	People	Locations	Reasons
1860	The Prince of Wales (later Edward VII)	(United Kingdom): Nova Scotia: Halifax, various other towns; United Province of Canada: Quebec City, Montreal, Saint-Hyacinthe, Sherbrooke, Ottawa, Almonte, Brockville, Arnprior, Kingston, Toronto, Collingwood, Paris, Brantford, Dunnville, London, Port Colborne, Fort Erie, Queenston, Niagara Falls, Windsor	Two month tour.
1861	The Prince Alfred (later Duke of Edinburgh)	(Nova Scotia) (United Kingdom): Maritimes; United Province of Canada: various towns and cities	Five week tour.
1869 – 1870	The Prince Arthur (later Duke of Connaught)	(Canada): Ontario: Ottawa, Pembroke; Quebec: Montreal, Aylmer	Based with the Rifle Brigade.
1878 – 1883	The Duke of Edinburgh (The Prince Alfred)	(Canada): Nova Scotia: Halifax	Commander of the Royal Navy's North Atlantic Squadron.
1878 – 1883	The Princess Louise, Marchioness of Lorne and the Marquess of Lorne	(Canada): Ontario: Ottawa, Toronto, Kingston, other towns; Quebec: Montreal, Quebec City, other towns; Manitoba: Winnipeg, other towns	Served as viceregal couple; during a visit to Kingston, Ontario, the viceregal couple visited Royal Military College of Canada and presented awards to prize-winning cadets. In addition, they laid a foundation stone at Queen's University in Kingston.
1880	The Prince Leopold (later Duke of Albany)	(Canada): Ontario: Ottawa, Toronto, Niagara Falls, various other towns; Quebec: Quebec City, Montreal	To visit his sister and brother-in-law.
1882	Prince George of Wales (later George V)	(Canada): Nova Scotia: Halifax; Ontario: Ottawa, Toronto, Niagara Falls; Quebec: Montreal, Quebec City	Served as a midshipman in the Royal Navy.
1890	The Duke and Duchess of Connaught (The Prince Arthur and Princess Louise Margaret)	(Canada): British Columbia: Victoria, Vancouver; Manitoba: Winnipeg; Maritimes; Ontario: Windsor, Toronto, various other towns; Quebec: Montreal, Quebec City, various other towns; Northwest Territories: Calgary	

== 20th century ==
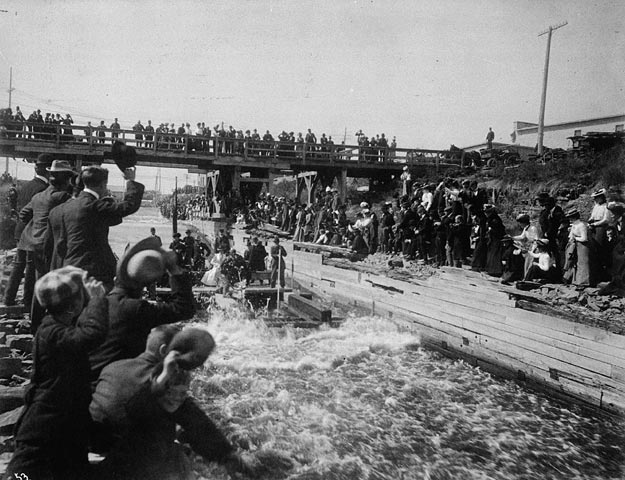
The Duke and Duchess of Cornwall riding a timber slide at Chaudière Falls on the Ottawa River in Ottawa, 1901.

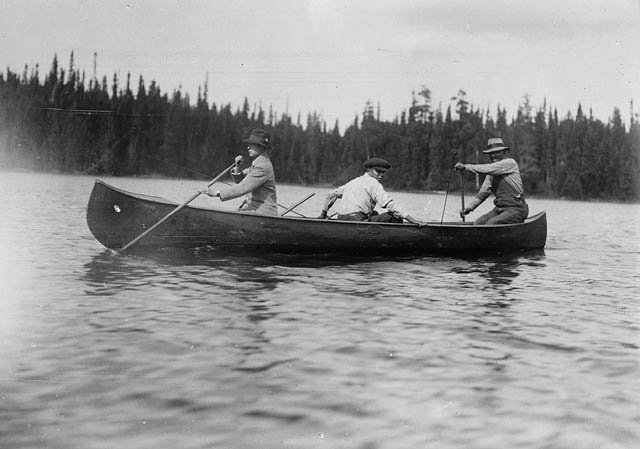
The Prince of Wales canoeing in Canada, 1919.

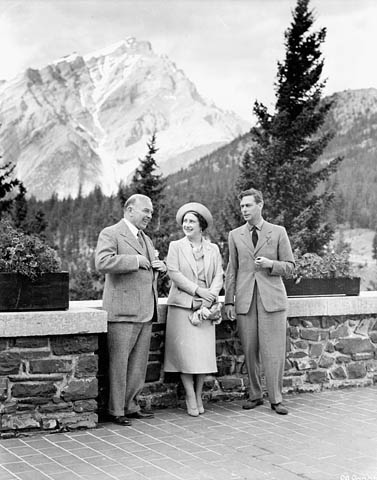
George VI and Queen Elizabeth with Prime Minister Mackenzie King in Banff, Alberta, 1939.

=== 1900–1949 ===
Years	People	Locations visited	Reasons
1900	Princess Louise of Schleswig-Holstein		
1901	The Duke and Duchess of Cornwall and York (later King George V and Queen Mary)	New Brunswick: Saint John; Nova Scotia: Halifax; Quebec: Quebec City, Montreal; Ontario: Ottawa, Toronto, London, Niagara, Hamilton, Kingston; Manitoba: Winnipeg; British Columbia: Vancouver, Victoria; Alberta: Calgary, Banff, Lake Louise	
1908	The Prince of Wales (later King George V)	Quebec: Quebec City	Tercentenary of Quebec City
1911 – 1916	The Duke and Duchess of Connaught and Princess Patricia of Connaught	All provinces and territories	Served as viceregal family
1911 – 1916	Prince Albert of Wales (later King George VI)	Quebec: Montreal; Ontario: Ottawa	To visit Prince Arthur and Princess Louise
1913	Prince Albert (later King George VI)	Maritimes	
1919	The Prince of Wales (later King Edward VIII)	New Brunswick: Saint John; Quebec: Quebec City; Ontario: Ottawa, Toronto, other towns Alberta: Calgary	Inspected the Cadet Corps at Bishop's College School
1923	The Prince of Wales (later King Edward VIII)	Alberta: Pekisko, other towns and cities	To stay at his ranch
1924	The Prince of Wales (later King Edward VIII)	Ontario: Ottawa; Alberta: Pekisko	To stay at his ranch
1926	Prince George (later Duke of Kent)	Ontario: Ottawa	
1927	The Prince of Wales (later King Edward VIII) and Prince George (later Duke of Kent)	Ontario: Ottawa, Toronto; Alberta: Pekisko (Prince of Wales only)	To stay at his ranch
1939	George VI and Queen Elizabeth	All provinces	First visit by a reigning monarch
1940 – 1946	Princess Alice, Countess of Athlone and the Earl of Athlone	All provinces and territories	Served as viceregal couple
1940 – 1943	The Duke of Connaught	All provinces and territories	Aide-de-camp to the Earl of Athlone
1941	The Duke of Kent	Nova Scotia; Ontario; Quebec	Visited air bases and training centres
1941	The Duke and Duchess of Windsor	Alberta: Pekisko	To stay at his ranch
1945	The Duke and Duchess of Windsor	New Brunswick	

=== 1950–1959 ===
Years	Dates	People	Locations visited	Reasons
1950		The Duke and Duchess of Windsor	Alberta: Pekisko	To stay at his ranch
1951	10/8 – 11/12	Princess Elizabeth, Duchess of Edinburgh (later Queen Elizabeth II) and the Duke of Edinburgh	Newfoundland: St. John's; Prince Edward Island: Charlottetown; Nova Scotia: Springhill, Truro, Sydney, Halifax; New Brunswick: Saint John; Quebec: Montreal, Quebec City, Saint-Hyacinthe, Rimouski, Drummondville; Ontario: Ottawa, Brockville, Royal Military College of Canada in Kingston, Trenton, Toronto, Niagara Falls, Hamilton, Brantford, St. Catharines, Windsor, Fort William, North Bay, Kapuskasing; Manitoba: Winnipeg; Saskatchewan: Regina, Saskatoon; Alberta: Edmonton, Calgary; British Columbia: Victoria, Vancouver	In Kingston, Ontario, to review the Royal Military College of Canada cadets on parade.
1954	7/29 – 8/17	The Duke of Edinburgh	Quebec; Ontario: Ottawa; British Columbia: Vancouver	British Empire and Commonwealth Games, developments in Northern Territories
1954	8/27 – 9/14	The Duchess of Kent (Princess Marina) and Princess Alexandra of Kent	New Brunswick: Saint John, Fredericton, Newcastle; Quebec: Quebec City, Montreal; Ontario: Toronto, Niagara Falls, Chatham, Windsor, London	
1954	11/12 – 11/17	Queen Elizabeth the Queen Mother	Ontario: Ottawa	
1955	9/29 – 10/25	The Princess Royal and Countess of Harewood	Quebec: Quebec City, Montreal, Hull; Ontario: Kingston, Fort Henry, Ottawa, Toronto, Niagara Falls, Malton; Manitoba: Saint Boniface; British Columbia: Victoria, Vancouver	
1957	10/12 – 10/16	Queen Elizabeth II and the Duke of Edinburgh	Ontario: Ottawa, Hull	To open 23rd parliament
1958	7/12 – 8/11	Princess Margaret	Nova Scotia: Yarmouth, Digby, Annapolis Valley, Halifax; New Brunswick: Fredericton; Quebec: Hull, Montreal, Quebec City; Ontario: Toronto, Niagara Falls, Stratford, Galt, Hamilton, Ottawa; Saskatchewan: Prince Albert National Park; Alberta: Banff, Banff National Park, Calgary; British Columbia: Peace River Gorge below Fort St. John, Comox, Courtenay, Fort Langley, Prince George, Quesnel, Williams Lake, Okanagan, Victoria, Vancouver, Abbotsford, Royal Roads Military College, Kelowna, Kamloops, Vernon, Penticton, Chilliwack	To celebrate the centennial of the establishment of the Colony of British Columbia
1958	Oct.	The Duke of Edinburgh	Ontario: Ottawa	To preside at two meetings during world conference of the English-Speaking Union
1959	6/18 – 8/1	Queen Elizabeth II and the Duke of Edinburgh	All provinces and territories Ontario: Prescott	To open Saint Lawrence Seaway
1959	8/8 – 8/11	Princess Alexandra of Kent	British Columbia: Vancouver, Victoria	

=== 1960–1969 ===
Years	Dates	People	Locations visited	Reasons
1960	Jun.	The Duke of Edinburgh	Ontario: Ottawa, Toronto	Commonwealth Study Conference
1962	5/12 – 6/3	The Duke of Edinburgh	Quebec: Montreal; Ontario: Ottawa, London, Toronto; British Columbia: Vancouver	Commonwealth Study Conference
1962	6/7 – 6/16	Queen Elizabeth the Queen Mother	Quebec: Montreal; Ontario: Ottawa, Toronto, Upper Canada Village	Centennial of the Black Watch (Royal Highland Regiment) of Canada
1962	6/13 – 6/28	The Princess Royal and Countess of Harewood	Quebec: Quebec City; Ontario: Trenton, Kingston, Toronto, Ottawa; British Columbia: Victoria, Vancouver	To present new colours to the Canadian Scottish Regiment (Princess Mary's)
1963	1/30 – 1/31	Queen Elizabeth II and the Duke of Edinburgh	British Columbia: Vancouver	Overnight stop
1963	9/18 – 9/26	The Duchess of Gloucester	Ontario: Ottawa, Toronto	
1964	9/17 – 9/23	Lady Patricia Ramsay	Alberta: Edmonton	To celebrate the jubilee of Princess Patricia's Canadian Light Infantry
1964	9/19 – 9/29	The Princess Royal and Countess of Harewood	Newfoundland: St. John's	To commemorate the 50th Anniversary of the departure from St. John's of first contingent of Royal Newfoundland Regiment
1964	10/5 – 10/13	Queen Elizabeth II and the Duke of Edinburgh	Ontario: Ottawa; Prince Edward Island: Charlottetown; Quebec: Quebec City :	Centenary of the Confederation Conferences
1965	6/23 – 6/27	Queen Elizabeth the Queen Mother	Ontario: Toronto	To celebrate the 50th anniversary of the Toronto Scottish Regiment
1966	3/18 – 3/19	Queen Elizabeth the Queen Mother	British Columbia: Vancouver, Victoria	
1966	3/21 – 3/23	The Duke of Edinburgh	Quebec: Montreal; Ontario: Toronto, Ottawa	To present medals to the recipients of The Duke of Edinburgh's Award
1967	5/14 – 6/16	Princess Alexandra, The Hon. Mrs Angus Ogilvy and The Hon. Angus Ogilvy	Quebec: Montreal; Ontario: Toronto, Ottawa; Manitoba: Brandon, Winnipeg; Saskatchewan: Regina; Alberta: Banff, Calgary, Edmonton, Jasper; British Columbia: Vancouver, Victoria, Vancouver Northwest Territories: Yellowknife, Hay River; Yukon: Whitehorse	
1967	6/29 – 7/5	Queen Elizabeth II and the Duke of Edinburgh	Quebec: Montreal; Ontario: Ottawa	Canadian Centennial, visit Expo 67
1967	7/10 – 7/22	Queen Elizabeth the Queen Mother	Newfoundland; Prince Edward Island; Nova Scotia; New Brunswick	To take part in the Canadian Centennial celebrations
1967	7/22 – 7/23	The Duke of Edinburgh	Manitoba: Winnipeg	To open 1967 Pan American Games
1967	10/5 – 10/12	Princess Margaret, Countess of Snowdon, and the Earl of Snowdon	Quebec: Montreal; Ontario: Toronto	To attend a fund raising ball for Canadian Cancer Society Auxiliary of Princess Margaret Hospital, visit Expo 67
1967	11/7 – 11/11	The Duke of Edinburgh	Ontario: Toronto	Royal Agricultural Winter Fair, and attend conference as President of the Royal Agricultural Society of the Commonwealth
1968	7/3 – 7/8	The Duke and Duchess of Kent	Alberta: Calgary	To open the Calgary Stampede
1968	10/12 – 10/13	The Duke of Edinburgh	Ontario: Toronto	Royal Agricultural Winter Fair, and attend conference as President of the Royal Agricultural Society of the Commonwealth
1969	10/16 – 10/31	The Duke of Edinburgh	Newfoundland; New Brunswick; Quebec; Ontario: Ottawa; Alberta; British Columbia	To study operations of The Duke of Edinburgh's Award

=== 1970–1979 ===
Years	Dates	People	Locations visited	Reasons
1970	3/2 – 3/3	Queen Elizabeth II, the Duke of Edinburgh, and Princess Anne	British Columbia: Vancouver	Overnight stop
1970	7/3 – 7/4	The Prince of Wales	Ontario: Ottawa	
1970	7/5 – 7/15	Queen Elizabeth II, the Duke of Edinburgh, the Prince of Wales, and Princess Anne	Ontario: Ottawa (Prince of Wales only); Manitoba: Churchill, Thompson, Gillam, Flin Flon, Norway House, Swan River, The Pas, Dauphin, Clear Lake, Brandon, Bailey Farm, Portage la Prairie, Oakville, Winnipeg, Carman, Steinbach, Beauséjour, Lower Fort Garry; centenary anniversary of Manitoba's entry into Confederation; Northwest Territories: Frobisher Bay, Inuvik, Resolute Bay, Tuktoyaktuk	Centenary of Manitoba's entry into Confederation; Centenary of the Northwest Territories' entry into Confederation
1971	5/3 – 5/12	Queen Elizabeth II, the Duke of Edinburgh, and Princess Anne	British Columbia: Victoria, Vancouver, Duncan, Tofino, Kelowna, Vernon, Penticton, Williams Lake, Comox	Centenary of British Columbia's entry into Confederation
1971	9/24 – 9/26	Princess Margaret, Countess of Snowdon and the Earl of Snowdon	Manitoba: Winnipeg	To open the new Winnipeg Art Gallery
1973	6/25 – 7/5	Queen Elizabeth II and the Duke of Edinburgh	Newfoundland: Mount Carmel; Prince Edward Island: Charlottetown, Summerside; Ontario: Toronto, Cobourg, Kingston, Cambridge, Kitchener, Waterloo, London, St. Catharines, Niagara-on-the-Lake, Scarborough, Brampton, Malton; Saskatchewan: Regina; Alberta: Calgary	Centenary of PEI's entry into Confederation, tercentenary of Kingston, centennial of the Royal Canadian Mounted Police
1973	7/19 – 7/23	Princess Alexandra, The Hon. Mrs Angus Ogilvy and The Hon. Angus Ogilvy	Nova Scotia: Halifax, Pictou, Chester	To participate in celebrations marking the arrival of the Hector with the first Scottish settlers
1973	7/31 – 8/4	Queen Elizabeth II and the Duke of Edinburgh	Ontario: Ottawa	Commonwealth Heads of Government Meeting 1973
1974	1/25 – 1/27	Princess Anne and Mark Phillips	Ontario: Ottawa; Quebec: Hull	
1974	5/9 – 5/14	Princess Margaret, Countess of Snowdon, and the Earl of Snowdon	Manitoba: Winnipeg	Centenary of the City of Winnipeg
1974	6/25 – 7/1	Queen Elizabeth the Queen Mother	Quebec: Montreal; Ontario: Toronto	To visit the Toronto Scottish Regiment, present The Queen's Colours to the Black Watch Regiment
1974	10/14 – 10/16	The Duke of Edinburgh	Newfoundland: Gander, Botwood; New Brunswick: Fredericton; Quebec: Montreal	
1974	11/15 – 11/18	Princess Anne and Mark Phillips	Ontario: Toronto, Hamilton	To attend the Royal Agricultural Winter Fair
1975	3/22 – 3/23	The Duke of Edinburgh	New Brunswick: Fredericton	To visit The Royal Canadian Regiment
1975	4/20 – 4/30	The Prince of Wales	Maritimes; Ontario: Ottawa; Northwest Territories: Yellowknife	
1975	5/2 – 6/5	The Prince of Wales	Maritimes	
1975	6/26 – 6/29	The Duke and Duchess of Kent	Ontario: Toronto	To attend the Queen's Plate
1976	7/13 – 7/25	Queen Elizabeth II, the Duke of Edinburgh, the Prince of Wales, Princess Anne, Mark Phillips, Prince Andrew, and Prince Edward	Nova Scotia (Queen and Duke only); New Brunswick (Queen and Duke only); Quebec: Montreal, Brome Lake	To open, attend, and (in Princess Anne's case) participate in the Summer Olympics
1976	10/5 – 10/6	The Duke of Edinburgh	Ontario: Trenton	Overnight stop
1977	7/5 – 7/9	The Prince of Wales and Prince Andrew	Alberta: Calgary, various other towns	Centenary of the signing of Treaty 7, to attend the Calgary Stampede
1977	10/14 – 10/19	Queen Elizabeth II and the Duke of Edinburgh	Ontario: Ottawa	The Queen's Silver Jubilee, open 3rd session of 30th parliament
1977	Sept. – Dec.	Prince Andrew	Ontario: Lakefield, Toronto	To attend Lakefield College School
1977	11/23 – 11/27	The Duke of Edinburgh	Saskatchewan: Regina	To attend the Royal Agricultural Society conference sessions (Canadian Agribition Association)
1978	2/10 – 2/12	The Duke of Edinburgh	Ontario: Toronto	To attend a meeting on the 1980 Commonwealth Study Conference and to meet group leaders
1978	7/26 – 8/6	Elizabeth II, the Duke of Edinburgh, Prince Andrew, and Prince Edward	Newfoundland: St. John's, Deer Lake, Strawberry Hill, Corner Brook, Stephenville; Ontario (Prince Andrew only): Ottawa, various other towns and cities Saskatchewan: Regina, Yorkton, Fort Qu'Appelle, Balcarres, Melville, Moose Jaw, Saskatoon, Lloydminster; Alberta: Edmonton, Grande Prairie, Peace River, St. Paul, Vegreville, Fort Saskatchewan, Mundare, Chipman, Lamont, Bruderheim, Fort Edmonton	To open Commonwealth Games
1978	9/12 – 9/13	The Duke of Edinburgh	Newfoundland: Goose Bay	
1978	10/8 – 10/9	The Duke of Edinburgh	Newfoundland: Goose Bay	
1978	11/15 – 11/16	The Duke of Edinburgh	Manitoba: Winnipeg	To attend functions for the Saint Boniface General Hospital Research Foundation Award
1979	4/1 – 4/7	The Prince of Wales	Ontario: Toronto, Ottawa; Manitoba: Winnipeg; British Columbia: Victoria; Northwest Territories: Yellowknife	
1979	5/3 – 5/4	The Duke and Duchess of Kent	Ontario: Toronto, Brampton	To visit the Lorne Scots
1979	6/26 – 7/2	Queen Elizabeth the Queen Mother	Nova Scotia: Halifax; Ontario: Toronto	To present The Queen's Colours to the Canadian Forces Maritime Command, attend the opening of the International Gathering of the Clans, attend 120th running of the Queen's Plate
1979	10/2	The Duke of Edinburgh	Ontario: Toronto	To attend 150th anniversary of Upper Canada College
1979	10/23 – 10/24	The Duke of Edinburgh	Quebec: Montreal; Alberta: Calgary	To attend meeting of Commonwealth Study Conference
1979	11/12 – 11/18	Princess Anne	Ontario: Ottawa, Kingston, Toronto, Owen Sound	To attend Kick for Cansave and Cansave College Bowl Dinner, visit with Canadian regiments

=== 1980–1989 ===
Years	Dates	People	Locations visited	Reasons
1980	3/30 – 4/3	The Prince of Wales	Ontario: Ottawa; British Columbia: Vancouver, Victoria	To visit Pearson College of the Pacific, attend meetings of the Council
1980	4/25 – 5/4	Princess Alexandra, The Hon. Mrs Angus Ogilvy	Ontario: Ottawa, Toronto; British Columbia: Victoria, Nanaimo	To celebrate the 120th anniversary of the Queen's Own Rifles of Canada, visit the Canadian Scottish Regiment (Princess Mary's)
1980	5/17 – 6/7	The Duke of Edinburgh	Quebec: Quebec City; Ontario: Kingston, London, Hamilton; Alberta: Calgary	To attend Commonwealth Study Conference and visit the Royal Hamilton Light Infantry.
1980	7/18 – 7/28	Princess Margaret, Countess of Snowdon	Ontario: Ottawa; Saskatchewan: Saskatoon; Alberta	75th anniversary of Alberta and Saskatchewan's entry into Confederation
1980	9/27 – 10/1	The Duke of Edinburgh	Newfoundland: Goose Bay; Ontario: Ottawa	To attend the British Commonwealth Ex-Services League Convention
1981	7/2 – 7/7	Queen Elizabeth the Queen Mother	Ontario: Ottawa, Toronto, Niagara-on-the-Lake	To attend the Queen's Plate, celebrate bicentennial of Niagara-on-the-Lake
1981	7/6 – 7/13	Princess Margaret, Countess of Snowdon	Ontario: Ottawa, Toronto, Cambridge, Timmins, Gravenhurst	To visit the Highland Fusiliers of Canada
1982	4/15 – 4/19	Queen Elizabeth II and the Duke of Edinburgh	Ontario: Ottawa	To proclaim the Constitution Act 1982
1982	7/4 – 7/17	Princess Anne	Ontario: Ottawa; Manitoba: Winnipeg, Brandon, Selkirk; Saskatchewan: Regina, Wilcox, Gravelbourg, Estevan, Alameda, Moosomin, Saskatoon; Yukon: Haines Junction, Kluane National Park and Reserve, Whitehorse	Centenary of St. Paul's Cathedral, centenary of Gravelbourg, centenary of Estevan, centenary of Alameda, centenary of Moosomin, centenary of Saskatoon
1982	10/29 – 10/31	The Prince of Wales	British Columbia: Victoria	To visit Pearson College of the Pacific
1982	11/14 – 11/17	Prince and Princess Michael of Kent	Ontario: Toronto	To attend the Royal Agricultural Winter Fair
1983	4/8 – 4/11	Queen Elizabeth II and the Duke of Edinburgh	British Columbia: Victoria, Vancouver, Nanaimo, Vernon, Kamloops, New Westminster	
1983	6/3 – 6/6	The Duke of Gloucester	Ontario: Ottawa	Centenary celebrations of St John Ambulance in Canada
1983	6/14 – 7/1	The Prince and Princess of Wales	Newfoundland: St. John's, Carbonear, Harbour Grace; Prince Edward Island: Charlottetown, Montague, Summerside; Nova Scotia: Halifax, Shelburne, Dartmouth, Lunenburg; New Brunswick: Saint John, Dalhousie, St. Andrews, Charlo; Ontario: Ottawa; Alberta: Edmonton	Official opening of World Universities Games, to celebrate the 400th anniversary of Sir Humphrey Gilbert taking possession of Newfoundland, centennial of the settlement of the United Empire Loyalists in Nova Scotia and New Brunswick
1983	6/30 – 7/6	The Duke of Edinburgh	Ontario: Ottawa, London	Centenary of the Royal Canadian Regiment, present Duke of Edinburgh Gold Awards
1983	7/18 – 8/7	Prince Andrew	Ontario: Toronto, Peterborough; Northwest Territories	Excursion with students from Lakefield College School
1984	2/22 – 2/25	Prince Michael of Kent	Nova Scotia: Halifax, Sydney, Baddeck, Fortress of Louisbourg	To commemorate the 75th anniversary of the first powered flight in the British Empire
1984	7/12 – 7/16	The Duke of Edinburgh	New Brunswick: Gagetown	To present new colours to the Royal Canadian Regiment
1984	7/27	The Duke of Edinburgh	Manitoba: Thompson	To present Duke of Edinburgh's Gold Awards
1984	9/24 – 10/7	Queen Elizabeth II and the Duke of Edinburgh	New Brunswick: Dieppe, Shediac, Moncton, Fredericton, Sackville, Riverview; Ontario: Ottawa, Morrisburg, Cornwall, Prescott, Kingston, Amherstview, Windsor, Brantford, Sudbury; Manitoba: (Queen alone) Winnipeg, Dauphin, Brandon, Dugald	Bicentennial of New Brunswick, bicentennial of Ontario, official opening of Science North
1985	6/4 – 6/7	The Duke of Edinburgh	Ontario: Ottawa, Toronto	To present badges to Girl Guides, for the International Forum of The Duke of Edinburgh's Award Scheme
1985	6/23 – 7/1	Prince Andrew	New Brunswick: Fredericton, Saint John, Sussex; Nova Scotia: Halifax, Annapolis Royal, Digby, North Sydney, Sydney; Ontario: Peterborough	Bicentennial of Fredericton, bicentennial of incorporation of Saint John, bicentennial of Sydney, centennial of North Sydney, opening of activity centre at Peterborough Liftlock
1985	7/12 – 7/19	Queen Elizabeth the Queen Mother	Ontario: Ottawa, Toronto; Saskatchewan: Regina; Alberta: CFB Cold Lake, Edmonton	To attend the Queen's Plate, attend 5th Angus Forum
1985	8/19 – 8/21	The Duke of Edinburgh	Alberta: Banff, Lake Louise	Centenary of Parks Canada, Duke of Edinburgh's Award, to present colours to the Royal Canadian Army Cadets
1985	11/6 – 11/10	Princess Alexandra, The Hon. Mrs Angus Ogilvy and The Hon. Angus Ogilvy	Ontario: Toronto, CFB Borden, Ottawa	To celebrate 125th Anniversary of the Queen's Own Rifles of Canada, open the Royal Agricultural Winter Fair, dinner with the Governor General at Rideau Hall
1986	4/30 – 5/7	The Prince and Princess of Wales	British Columbia: Victoria, Vancouver, Prince George, Kamloops, Kelowna, Nanaimo; Yukon: various towns	To open Expo 86
1986	6/20 – 6/26	Princess Anne	New Brunswick: Fredericton, Hartland, Grand Falls, Saint-Léonard, CFB Gagetown; Ontario: Toronto (with Mark Phillips), Guelph; Alberta: Calgary	To visit the 8th Canadian Hussars (Princess Louise's), inaugurate Guelph Equine Research Centre, visit site of the 1988 Winter Olympics
1986	7/10 – 7/16	The Princess Margaret, Countess of Snowdon	British Columbia: Vancouver	To visit Expo 86
1986	10/21 – 10/22	Princess Alexandra, The Hon. Mrs Angus Ogilvy and The Hon. Angus Ogilvy	Newfoundland: Gander	
1987	4/19 – 4/20	The Duke of Edinburgh	Saskatchewan: Regina	For Ramsar Convention on Wetlands
1987	6/3 – 6/5	The Duke of Edinburgh	Saskatchewan: Regina	For Ramsar Convention on Wetlands
1987	6/4 – 6/8	Queen Elizabeth the Queen Mother	Quebec: Montreal; Ontario: Ottawa	125th anniversary of the Black Watch (Royal Highland Regiment) of Canada
1987	6/24 – 6/25	Prince Edward	New Brunswick: Fredericton; Nova Scotia: Halifax, Truro, Dartmouth; Prince Edward Island: Charlottetown, Brudenell, Cavendish, Malpeque, CFB Summerside; Quebec: Mont-Carmel	For The Duke of Edinburgh's Award
1987	7/15 – 8/9	The Duke and Duchess of York	Ontario: Toronto, Thunder Bay, Niagara Falls, Mississauga, Cobourg, Muskoka; Manitoba: Winnipeg; Alberta: Edmonton, Medicine Hat, Head-Smashed-In Buffalo Jump; Northwest Territories: Yellowknife	To attend Queen's Plate, dedicate the Mississauga Civic Centre, 150th anniversary of Cobourg, visit Saint Boniface General Hospital Research Centre, canoe Thelon River
1987	10/9 – 10/24	Queen Elizabeth II and the Duke of Edinburgh	British Columbia: North Saanich, Qualicum Beach, Vancouver, Victoria, Esquimalt; Saskatchewan: Regina, Fort Qu'Appelle, Saskatoon, Yorkton, Canora, Veregin, Kamsack, Kindersley; Quebec: Quebec City, Sillery, Cap Tourmente, Rivière-du-Loup, La Pocatière	To participate in opening sessions of BC government, Commonwealth Heads of Government Meeting 1987
1987	10/25 – 10/26	The Duke of Edinburgh	Ontario: North Bay; Newfoundland: Gander	
1988	2/2 – 2/12	The Princess Royal	Alberta: Calgary	To attend the Winter Olympics
1988	6/4 – 6/11	Prince Edward	Newfoundland: St. John's, Deer Lake, Corner Brook; Ontario: Ottawa, Toronto	Heraldry ceremony for The Duke of Edinburgh's Award, 25th anniversary of the Duke of Edinburgh's Award in Canada, centennial of municipal government in Newfoundland, dedication of Gros Morne National Park as a World Heritage Site
1988	7/5 – 7/12	Princess Margaret, Countess of Snowdon	Nova Scotia: Halifax, Sambro, Canning; Ontario: Toronto, Hamilton, Bowmanville, Peterborough	To present new colours to the Princess Louise Fusiliers, unveil a memorial for fishermen lost at sea, celebrate 75th anniversary of the Nova Scotia Women's Institute, attend the Queen's Plate, open a new wing of Variety Village, the Royal Botanical Gardens, attend civic luncheon, visit Dofasco, reopen the restored Bowmanville Town Hall
1988	11/16 – 11/18	The Princess Royal	Ontario: Toronto	To attend the Royal Agricultural Winter Fair
1989	3/12 – 3/15	The Duke of Edinburgh	Ontario: Toronto	Duke of Edinburgh's Award
1989	3/21 – 3/22	The Duke of Edinburgh	Newfoundland: St. John's	To present awards at Government House
1989	5/16 – 5/17	The Duke of Edinburgh	British Columbia: Victoria	Dinner with the Lieutenant Governor
1989	5/18 – 5/21	The Duke of Edinburgh	Quebec: Montreal, Varennes, Sherbrooke, Lennoxville, Compton; British Columbia: Victoria	Provincial dinner, luncheon-meeting with Montreal Canadian Club, Duke of Edinburgh's Gold Award presentation, 35th anniversary of the Université de Sherbrooke, United Empire Loyalists of Canada Committee, Bishop's College School Cadet inspection, open Bishop's University Chapel and arboretum
1989	7/5 – 7/10	Queen Elizabeth the Queen Mother	Ontario: Ottawa, Toronto London	To attend the Queen's Plate, open Western Counties Wing at Parkwood Hospital, unveil a statue of Dr. Frederick Banting
1989	7/13 – 7/25	The Duke and Duchess of York	Prince Edward Island: Charlottetown, York, Souris, Basin Head, Fort Amherst, Summerside; Quebec: Quebec City, La Malbaie, Lac-au-Saumon, Port-au-Persil, Baie-Sainte-Catherine, Montreal, Hull; Ontario: Ottawa; Saskatchewan: Prince Albert, Nipawin, Lac La Ronge First Nation, La Ronge, Meadow Lake, Saskatoon, Swift Current, Regina	To attend Jamboree 89
1989	9/18 – 9/21	Prince Edward	Ontario: Toronto	Premiere of The Phantom of the Opera
1989	9/20 – 9/25	Princess Alexandra, The Hon. Lady Ogilvy	British Columbia: Vancouver	To celebrate the 75th anniversary of the Canadian Scottish Regiment (Princess Mary's)

=== 1990–1999 ===
Years	Dates	People	Locations visited	Reasons
1990	5/7 – 5/10	The Duke of Gloucester	Nova Scotia: Halifax; Ontario: Ottawa, Toronto	Attend engagements related to the Order of Saint John
1990	5/16 – 5/17	The Duke of Edinburgh	New Brunswick: Fredericton	Engagements at CFB Gagetown with the Royal Canadian Regiment
1990	5/20 – 5/21	The Duke of Edinburgh	Newfoundland: Gander	Overnight stop
1990	6/27 – 7/1	Elizabeth II	Ontario: Ottawa; Alberta: Calgary, Red Deer	Presentation of new Queen's Colour to the Calgary Highlanders
1990	7/5 – 7/8	Prince Edward	Manitoba: Winnipeg, St. Malo, Gillam, Churchill	To open the Western Canada Summer Games, visit Limestone Power Plant, visit Eskimo Museum, whale watching
1991	3/4 – 3/6	The Duchess of Kent	Ontario: Toronto	To celebrate the 40th anniversary of the National Ballet of Canada
1991	6/30 – 7/6	The Princess Royal	Newfoundland: St. John's, St. Anthony, L'Anse aux Meadows, Red Bay, Corner Brook; Nova Scotia: Halifax, Dartmouth, Pictou	To celebrate 75th anniversary of Beaumont-Hamel, visit Royal Newfoundland Regiment, attend the Gathering of the Clans, visit the Black Community Centre
1991	9/13 – 9/16	The Duke of Kent	Ontario: Toronto, Brampton	To visit the Lorne Scots
1991	10/23 – 10/29	The Prince and Princess of Wales, Princes William and Harry	Ontario: Toronto; Prince and Princess of Wales only: Sudbury, Niagara Falls, Kingston, Ottawa	To present replica of Queen Victoria's Royal Charter to Queen's University, on the 150th anniversary of the university's 1841 founding; to receive honorary degree from Queen's
1991	10/23 – 10/26	Prince Edward	Quebec: Montreal; Alberta: Calgary; British Columbia: Vancouver, Victoria	Fund raising dinners and Gold award presentations for The Duke of Edinburgh's Award, Commonwealth Games organization
1991	11/6 – 11/11	The Duchess of York	Ontario: Toronto, Ottawa	To visit Sunnybrook Hospital, Hospital for Sick Children, dinner at 24 Sussex Drive, attend Remembrance Day ceremony
1992	3/7 – 3/12	The Duke of Edinburgh	Alberta: Calgary; British Columbia: Vancouver, Victoria	CFB Suffield, World Wildlife Fund engagements
1992	3/25 – 3/26	The Duke of Edinburgh	Nova Scotia: Halifax	
1992	5/3 – 5/7	Prince Edward	Newfoundland: St. John's, Churchill Falls, Goose Bay	To present Duke of Edinburgh's Awards, Sir Wilfred Grenfell 100th Anniversary
1992	6/30 – 7/2	Elizabeth II	Ontario: Ottawa Quebec: Hull	To celebrate 125th anniversary of Confederation and her Ruby Jubilee
1992	7/14 – 7/17	The Duke of Edinburgh	Ontario: Thunder Bay; Manitoba: Churchill; Alberta: Calgary; Northwest Territories: Iqaluit	Royal Agricultural Society of the Commonwealth Conference
1992	9/25 – 9/27	The Duke of York	Ontario: Lakefield, Toronto	Alumni Days at Lakefield College School
1992	11/7 – 11/8	Princess Alexandra, The Hon. Lady Ogilvy and The Hon. Sir Angus Ogilvy	Newfoundland: St. John's	
1992	11/8 – 11/14	Prince Michael of Kent	Quebec: Knowlton; Alberta: Edmonton, Lake Louise, Calgary	To visit Bombardier, participate in Remembrance Day ceremonies, attend the Canadian Finals Rodeo, attend regimental events
1993	3/9 – 3/10	The Duke of Edinburgh	Newfoundland: St. John's	Dinner with the Newfoundland
1993	3/25 – 3/26	The Duke of Edinburgh	Newfoundland: St. John's	
1993	3/26 – 4/15	Prince Edward	Prince Edward Island: Fredericton; Nova Scotia: Halifax; Ontario: Toronto, London; Manitoba: Winnipeg; Alberta: Edmonton; British Columbia: Vancouver, Whistler	For Duke of Edinburgh's Awards presentation and fund raising
1993	9/20 – 9/24	The Duke of York	Nova Scotia: Halifax; Ontario: Ottawa, CFB Petawawa, Pembroke	To meet with the Canadian Airborne Regiment, unveil a monument, visit a senior citizens home, visit the Canadian Forces Maritime Command, dinner at Government House
1993	9/30 – 10/3	The Prince Edward	Ontario: Toronto; British Columbia: Victoria	To raise funds for Victoria Commonwealth Games Society, meeting of Assembly of Commonwealth Games Federation, visit sites for 1994 Games, Duke of Edinburgh's Award
1993	10/11 – 10/15	The Duke of Edinburgh	Quebec: Montreal; Ontario: Toronto	For World Wildlife Fund of Canada, Duke of Edinburgh's Award, Upper Canada College, and Empire Club
1993	11/8 – 11/12	Princess Margaret, Countess of Snowdon	Ontario: Toronto	To attend Royal Agricultural Winter Fair, open new facilities at The Princess Margaret Hospital
1994	3/16 – 3/17	The Duke of Edinburgh	Newfoundland: Gander	
1994	8/13 – 8/22	Queen Elizabeth II and the Duke of Edinburgh	Nova Scotia: Halifax, Sydney, Fortress of Louisbourg, Dartmouth; British Columbia: Victoria, Twin Islands, Prince George (Queen only), Prince Rupert, Khutzeymateen Inlet (Prince Philip only); Northwest Territories: Yellowknife, Rankin Inlet, Iqaluit	To open Commonwealth Games
1994	8/13 – 8/29	Prince Edward	Saskatchewan: Regina, Fort Qu'Appelle; Alberta: Calgary; British Columbia: Victoria, Kelowna	To present Duke of Edinburgh's Awards, to attend the Globe Theatre, visit Fort Qu'Appelle Indian Reserve; attend Commonwealth Games
1995	9/20 – 9/22	The Duke of York	Ontario: Toronto, Lakefield	To visit the Toronto Golf Club, open new wing at Lakefield College School
1996	4/23 – 3/29	The Prince of Wales	New Brunswick: Fredericton, Saint John, Miramichi, Caraquet; Ontario: Ottawa, Toronto, Hamilton; Manitoba: Churchill, Winnipeg	
1996	6/2 – 6/3	Prince and Princess Michael of Kent	Quebec: Montreal	To visit Bombardier
1996	6/23 – 6/24	Prince Edward	Ontario: Toronto	To attend Gold Award Ceremony for the Duke of Edinburgh's Award, filming for Charter for Business Video, media launch for the Charter for Business at the CN Tower
1996	7/10 – 7/14	Princess Margaret, Countess of Snowdon	Ontario: Toronto	Visit Princess Margaret Hospital, re-open Princess Margaret Junior School
1996	11/4 – 11/6	The Duke of Edinburgh	Newfoundland: Gander; Ontario: Toronto	To attend Royal Agricultural Winter Fair, media launch for The Duke of Edinburgh's Award Charter for Business, presentation of gold awards certificates at Hart House, visit to World Wildlife Fund offices and WWF press conference, visit to St. Michael's Hospital
1997	3/19 – 3/22	The Duke of Edinburgh	Alberta; Nova Scotia	For World Wildlife Fund press conference, presentation of Duke of Edinburgh's Award gold awards certificates
1997	6/23 – 7/2	Queen Elizabeth II and the Duke of Edinburgh	Newfoundland: St. John's, Gander (Prince Philip only), Bonavista, North West River, Shetshatshiu, Happy Valley, Goose Bay (Prince Philip only); Ontario: London, Stratford, Brantford, Toronto, North Bay, Petawawa (Prince Philip only), Ottawa; Manitoba: Winnipeg (Prince Philip only)	500th anniversary of the discovery of Newfoundland, to see damage from floods
1997	10/23 – 10/28	The Duke of York	Ontario: Toronto, Lakefield	To visit Lakefield College School
1998	3/28 – 3/28	The Prince of Wales, Princes William and Harry of Wales	British Columbia: Vancouver, Whistler	
1998	6/25 – 6/28	The Princess Royal	New Brunswick: Fredericton, Moncton	To celebrate the 125th Anniversary of the 8th Canadian Hussars (Princess Louise's)
1998	10/2 – 10/4	The Duke of Kent	Quebec: Mont-Tremblant	To attend the VIII Commonwealth Study Conference
1998	10/2 – 10/4	The Duke of Edinburgh	Ontario: Ottawa	To attend Commonwealth Study Conference
1999	3/9 – 3/10	Prince Edward	British Columbia: Vancouver	To attend Gold Award Ceremony for the Duke of Edinburgh's Award, reception and dinner for Charter for Business
1999	7/22 – 7/27	The Princess Royal	Manitoba: Winnipeg	To attend the XIII Pan American Games
1999	9/17 – 9/21	The Duke of York	Ontario: Toronto, Lakefield	To attend fund-raising dinner and the Change of Command parade of The Queen's York Rangers, visit Lakefield College School

== See also ==
- Royal tours of Canada
- List of royal tours of Canada (21st century)
- List of official overseas trips made by Edward VII
- List of official overseas trips made by George V
- List of official overseas trips made by Edward VIII
- List of official overseas trips made by George VI
- List of Commonwealth visits made by Queen Elizabeth II
- Royal and viceroyal transport in Canada
