= Royal tours of Canada =

Tours of Canada by the Canadian Royal Family

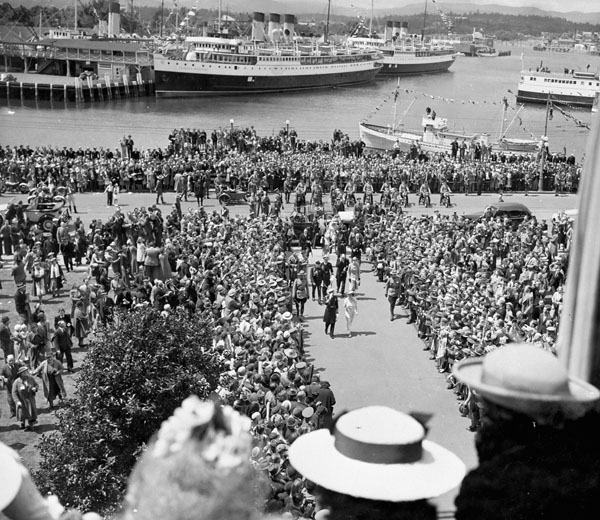
A crowd in Victoria, British Columbia, watch King George VI and his royal consort, Queen Elizabeth, coming up the walkway during their 1939 royal tour of Canada

Since 1786, members of the Canadian royal family have visited Canada, either as an official tour, a working tour, a vacation, or a period of military service. The first member to visit was the future king William IV in 1786. In 1939, King George VI became the first reigning monarch to tour the country.

== Purpose and organization ==
Originally, official tours were events predominantly for Canadians to see and possibly meet members of their royal family, with the associated patriotic pomp and spectacle. However, nearing the end of the 20th century, such occasions took on the added dimension of a theme; for instance, the 2005 tour of Saskatchewan and Alberta by Queen Elizabeth II and Prince Philip, Duke of Edinburgh, was deemed to be a vehicle for the Queen and Canadians to honour "the spirit of nation builders" and the couple's tour in 2010 was themed "honouring the Canadian record of service—past, present, and future."

Between 1951 and 2018, 24 members of the royal family toured the country; at least one per year from 1957 to 2018. Queen Elizabeth II undertook the most tours of any member of the royal family: 22 between 1951 and 2010, followed by her son, Charles, who conducted his first in 1970.

Official royal tours have always been vested with civic importance, providing a regionalised country with a common thread of loyalty. The Saskatchewan Office of Visual Identity and Protocol states that, "royal visits lend the prestige of the royal family to worthy causes such as health care, education, the arts, the disabled, multicultural groups, and the volunteer sector. And they attract national and international attention to Saskatchewan's resources, industry, culture, and tourism."

Royal tours can take more than a year to organize. The planning is coordinated by the Canadian secretary to the King. The regions to be visited are decided by a rotational formula. Themes are decided upon by the King's secretary together with the minister of Canadian heritage and the Office of the Prime Minister. Traditionally, the coincidence of a royal tour and a federal election is avoided, so no incumbent politician can attempt to use the relevant member or members of the royal family to shore up support for him or herself.

=== Badges ===
Beginning with the royal tour undertaken by Princess Elizabeth, Duchess of Edinburgh (later Queen Elizabeth II) in 1951, unique badges were created for Elizabeth's official tours of Canada. Though none were produced between 1951 and 1970, one was devised for each of the queen's tours thereafter, until her last in 2010. The same was done for tours carried out by Elizabeth's consort, Prince Philip, Duke of Edinburgh, beginning in 1985, and by their children; the first for Prince Charles was designed in 1975, the first for Princess Anne in 1979, the first for Prince Andrew in 1985, and the first for Prince Edward in 1987. The initial badge for tours by the Queen Mother was produced in 1979, and those for Princess Margaret and Princess Alexandra both came in 1980; the first for Prince William was devised for his royal tour in 2011.

The badge for the royal tour of Prince Charles in 2014, which was worn as a pin by security and support staff

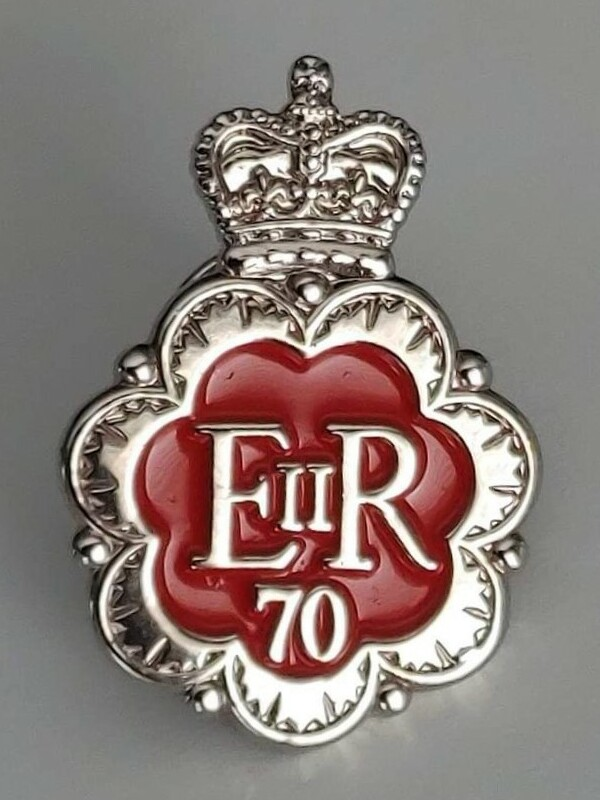
The Canadian Platinum Jubilee emblem, which inspired the 2022 royal tour badge

The badge for Princess Elizabeth consists of a gold maple leaf surrounded by a gold circle bearing the words a mari usque ad mare (the official motto of Canada), along with "Canada" and the year, 1951. Since the 1970s, the designs commonly employ the royal person's royal cypher (typically the initial of their Christian name surmounted by the appropriate heraldic crown or coronet) along with a maple leaf, rendered in various styles, on a particular background shape and combination of colours. Only Charles's badges differed by using the Prince of Wales's feathers in place of a cypher and a maple leaf as its own element; the sole exception is the badge for his tour to mark the Queen's Platinum Jubilee in 2022, which was shaped to match the Canadian jubilee emblem. For the two royal tours conducted by Prince Andrew and his wife, Sarah, Duchess of York, in 1987 and 1989, the cypher used was their initials intertwined. For the 1976 tour of Canada by Queen Elizabeth II, during which she opened the Summer Olympics in Montreal, the badge design included the Olympic Rings.

The badges were initially conceived by Bruce Beatty for the Department of the secretary of state of Canada. Beginning in 2012, the concept was attributed to Cathy Bursey-Sabourin, Fraser Herald. They are worn as a pins by the Royal Canadian Mounted Police security detail and logistics personnel during official Canadian royal tours (as opposed to working, private, or provincial tours).

== Walkabouts ==
During the royal tour of King George VI and Queen Elizabeth in 1939, the Queen initiated the tradition of the "royal walkabout", though her brother-in-law, the former king Edward VIII, had often met ordinary Canadian people in 1919, when Prince of Wales; as he said, "getting off the train to stretch my legs, I would start up conversations with farmers, section hands, miners, small town editors, or newly arrived immigrants from Europe."

== 18th century ==
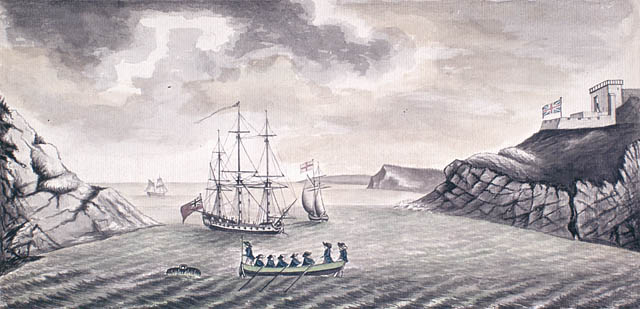
HMS Pegasus in the harbour of St. John's, Newfoundland, under the command of Prince William Henry, the first member of the royal family to visit Canada

As an officer in the Royal Navy, Prince William Henry (later King William IV) was the first member of the royal family to visit the Newfoundland Colony, the colony of Nova Scotia, and the Province of Quebec (later Lower and Upper Canada), arriving halfway through 1786 and remaining until 1788, with a posting to the Caribbean and a return to the United Kingdom in between.

Prince Edward, Duke of Kent and Strathearn became the second member of the royal family to tour the Canadian colonies and the first to live there for an extended period of time. He arrived in Quebec City in 1791 and resided there, also visiting Upper Canada in 1792, until departing for the Martinique in 1794. He then lived in Halifax until 1800, with a brief return to the United Kingdom in 1799.

== 19th century ==
The 19th century saw the beginning of modern royal tours in the country, with travel becoming easier and faster due to technological innovations such as the steamship, and rail transports. The mid-18th century marked the final time a member of the royal family made a transatlantic crossing by sailing ship; as royal family members began to travel by steamship in the late-19th century. While travelling through Canada, multiple modes of transportation were used when touring within Canada, including rail, on foot, and various-sized water vessels.

=== 1860 royal tour ===
On 14 May 1859, the Legislative Assembly of the Province of Canada petitioned Queen Victoria, and other members of the royal family to visit Montreal for the opening of Victoria Bridge. Unwilling to leave London in the hands of rivaling politicians, Victoria instead accepted the Canadian invitation on behalf of her son, Albert Edward, the prince of Wales (later Edward VII). The prince of Wales undertook a two-month tour of Newfoundland, New Brunswick, Nova Scotia, Prince Edward Island, and the Province of Canada in 1860. This first official royal tour of British North America was considered a success and helped lead to the unification of the colonies seven years later by confirming a common bond between their inhabitants. The prince of Wales' royal tour was used as the standard model for future royal tours for the next century.

==== Newfoundland and the Maritime colonies ====
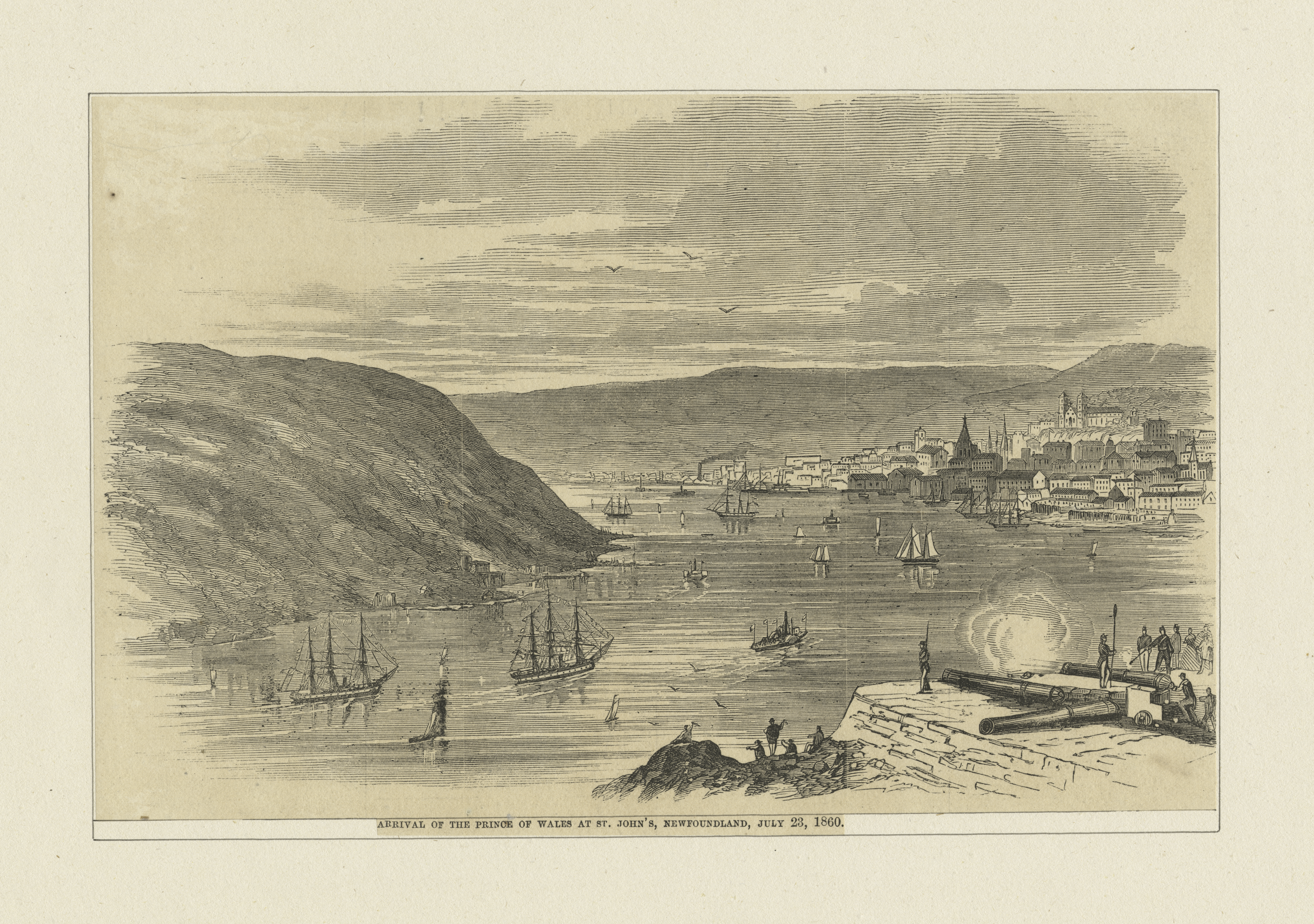
The arrival of Albert Edward, Prince of Wales, aboard HMS Hero, in St. John's harbour, July 1860

The prince of Wales reached St. John's, Newfoundland in 1860, receiving the typical welcome of an official address, a levee, and a formal ball. During his time there, he attended the St. John's Regatta and was gifted a Newfoundland dog on behalf of Newfoundlanders.

Travelling from St. John's he arrived in Halifax on 2 August and then on to Windsor and Hantsport. The royal party boarded HMS Styx to Saint John. On 4 August, the prince travelled the St John River to Fredericton, where he attended a reception and inaugurated a park. He thereafter travelled to Pictou, Nova Scotia, and returned to several communities, including Saint John, and Windsor.

He landed at Charlottetown, Prince Edward Island, on 10 August. Along with formal ball and levee, the prince toured the countryside around Charlottetown and visited Province House.

==== Province of Canada ====
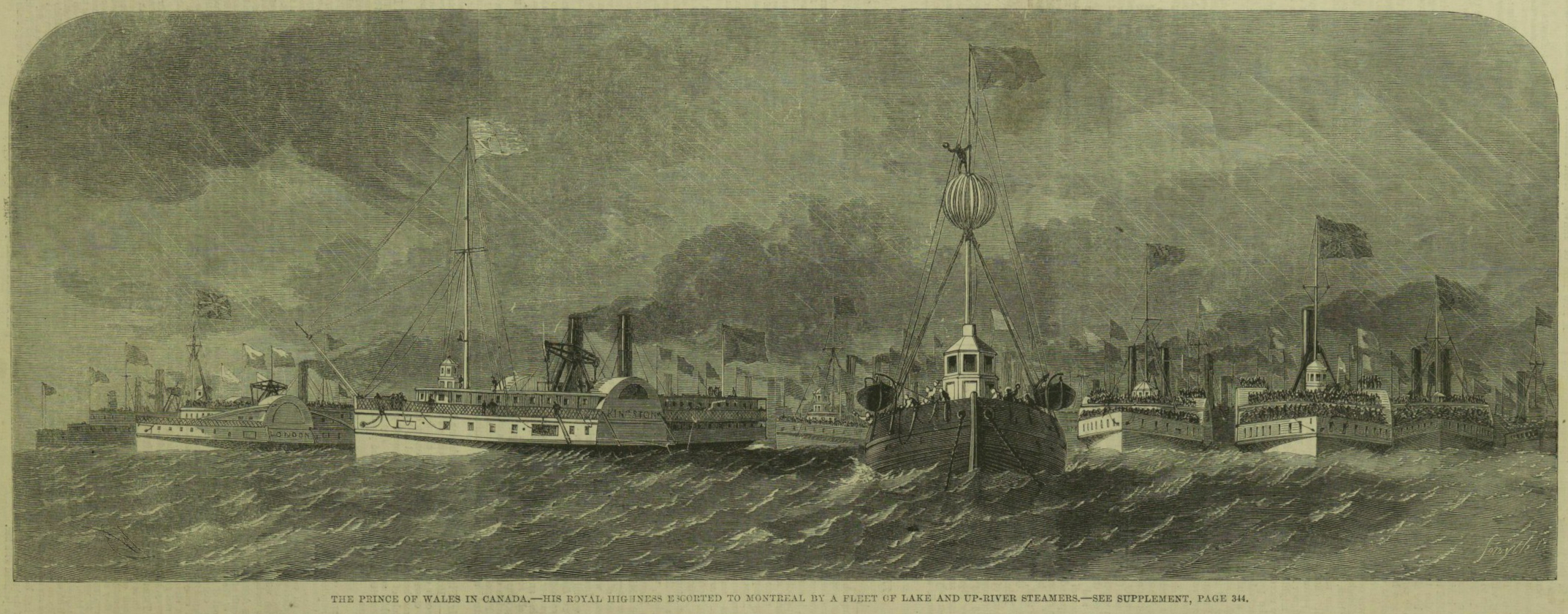
The prince of Wales escorted to Montreal by a fleet of steamships.

The prince of Wales was formally welcomed into the Province of Canada by a Canadian delegation, who came aboard HMS Hero near Percé Rock. The Canadian welcome delegation consisted of the governor general of the Province of Canada, Edmund Walker Head, and Joint Premiers, George-Étienne Cartier, and John A. Macdonald. Arriving in Quebec City on 17 August, the prince knighted Narcisse Belleau, Speaker of the Legislative Council, and Henry Smith, Speaker of the Legislative Assembly. During his time there, he also visited Montmorency Falls, and made an address at the Université Laval.

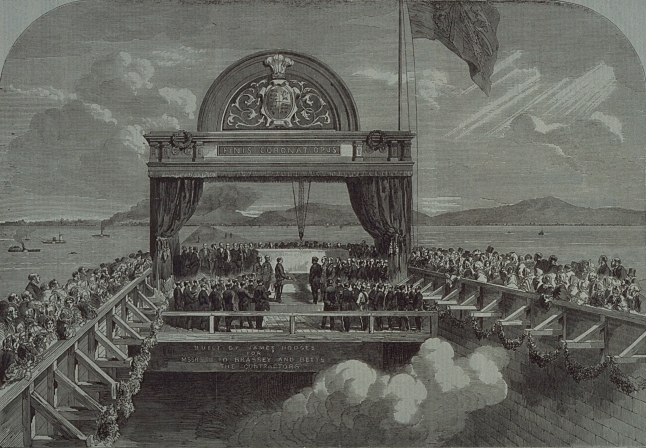
The prince of Wales dedicating Victoria Bridge in Montreal.

Following his visit to Quebec City, the prince of Wales proceeded towards Montreal aboard HMS Hero, joined by several members of the Legislative Assembly near Trois-Rivières. Arriving in Montreal, he took a specially-built open railway car to the Victoria Bridge in Pointe-Saint-Charles, and tapped in-place the final-laid stone for the bridge. During his five-day stay in Montreal, he stayed at the viceregal residence Spencerwood, and inaugurated the city's Crystal Palace, recalling the favourable impression made by Canadians at the Great Exhibition in an address to the crowd.

At Ottawa, the prince laid the foundation stone of the parliament buildings, canoed on the Ottawa River, and rode a timber slide on the Chaudière Falls. Travelling towards Toronto aboard the steamer Kingston, visits were planned for Belleville, and Kingston, although anti-Catholic demonstrators from the Orange Order prevented the prince from disembarking. In an attempt to not embroil the prince in a controversy, Henry Pelham-Clinton, the under-secretary of state who joined the prince on his tour, informed mayors that they would not disembark until the demonstrators were dispersed. Sailing further west, the prince visited Cobourg, Rice Lake, and Peterborough, where he received a reception from the Mississaugas. He then proceeded to Port Hope, re-boarding Kingston to sail on to Toronto.

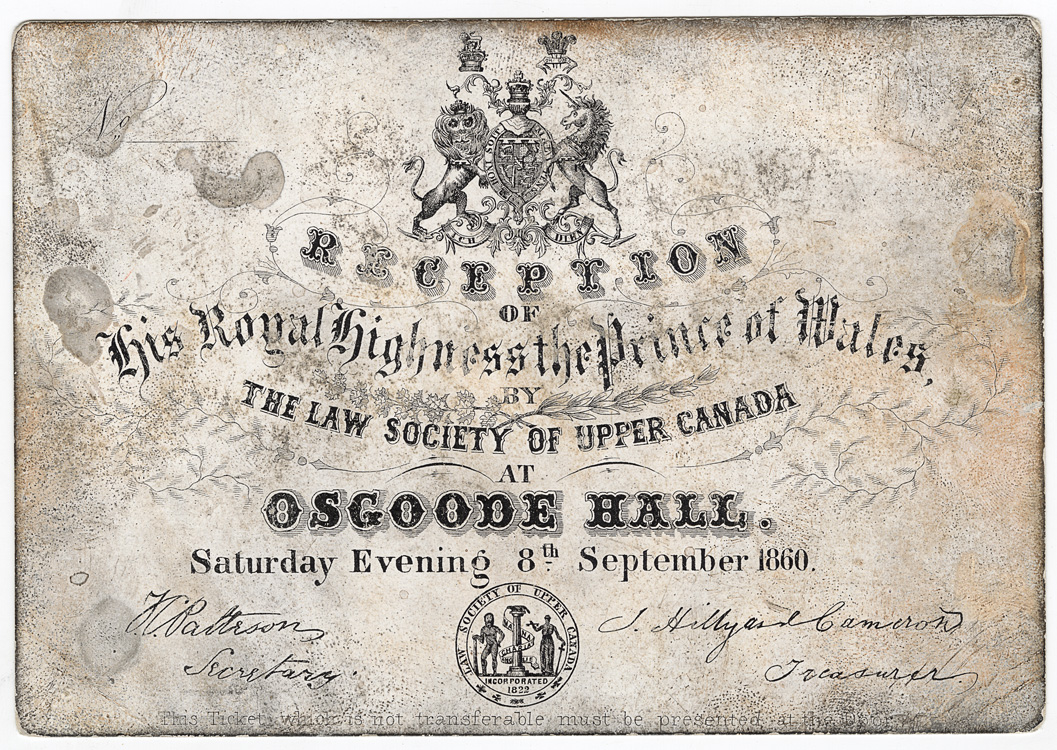
A ticket for a reception for the prince of Wales, held by the Law Society of Upper Canada in Toronto.

During a levee in Toronto, the prince received a delegation from Belleville and Kingston, tending apologies for the early incident. On 10 September, he took a one-day excursion to Collingwood, before returning to Toronto the following day. On his way back, he visited and received addresses from Aurora, Barrie, Bradford, and Newmarket. In Toronto, the prince attended the Royal Canadian Yacht Club's regatta, agreeing to become its patron; and opened Allan Gardens, and Queen's Park to the public. He departed the city for London, Ontario on 12 September, visiting Guelph and Stratford on the way. From London, he travelled to Sarnia, in order to attend a gathering of 150 First Nations representatives in the Province of Canada. Following this gathering, he briefly returned to London, before travelling by railway to the Niagara Peninsula.

In the peninsula, he visited Brantford, Chippewa, Fort Erie, and Queenston. The Niagara Falls were illuminated for the first time during his tour of the falls. There, he rode on the Maid of the Mist. At Queenston, he met with 160 War of 1812 veterans, dedicated a rebuilt Brock's Monument, and visited Laura Secord. From Queenston, he moved towards Niagara-on-the-Lake, St. Catharines, and Hamilton.

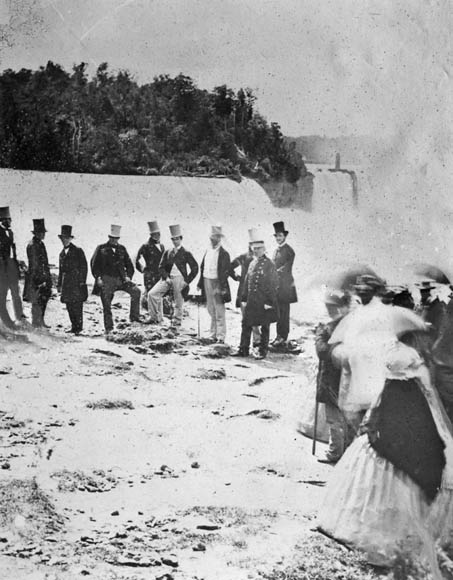
The prince of Wales touring Niagara Falls, Canada West, September 1860.

Completing his royal tour of the Province of Canada in late-September, the prince of Wales departed for the United States from Windsor, Ontario. Taking a month-long personal tour of the United States, he travelled under the pseudonym "Lord Renfrew," in an attempt to not attract attention to himself. The Canadian co-premieres saw off the prince's during his departure from Canada, and again from the United States, travelling to Portland, Maine, on 20 October 1860 to see the prince off.

=== 1861–1883 ===
In 1861, Prince Alfred took a five-week tour of The Maritimes, Newfoundland, and the Province of Canada. While escorting Prince Alfred through Canada West, the governor general of Canada used the opportunity to make sketches of American defences around the Great Lakes.

From 1869 to 1870, Prince Arthur was stationed in Canada as a British Army officer in the Rifle Brigade's Montreal detachment. Arriving in Halifax, he undertook a two-month royal tour of the colony of Prince Edward Island, and the newly formed Dominion of Canada, before returning to military duty in Montreal. In the same year, the Six Nations of the Grand River conferred the title of chief to Prince Arthur. In a formal ceremony, the chief of the three "clans" of the Mohawks received the prince, and conferred upon him the name "Kavakoudge," meaning "the sun flying from east to west under the guidance of the Great Spirit." Although the title of chief was bestowed as an honorary title to a number of individuals, Arthur underwent the necessary rituals to formalize the title in Mohawk society.

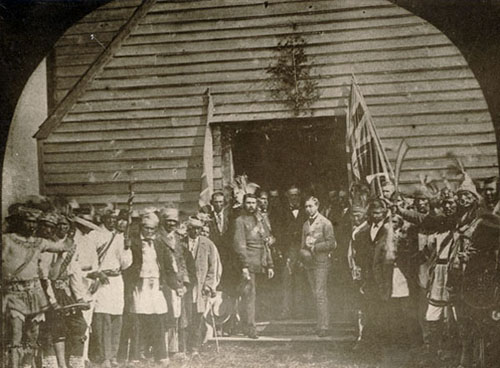
During his 1869 royal tour, Prince Arthur met with the chiefs of the Six Nations at the Mohawk Chapel.

During his time in Canada, Prince Arthur became the first member of the royal family to attend the opening of the Canadian parliament, in February 1870. Prince Arthur, along with his regiment, was present at the Battle of Eccles Hill, a raid conducted by the American-based Fenian Brotherhood, on 25 May 1870. The prince was awarded the Canada General Service Medal for his participation in the Fenian raids. Returning to the United Kingdom in 1870, Prince Arthur would return to Canada on two more occasions, the latter visit as the governor general of Canada.

Other members of the royal family were also in Canada as a part of their military service during the late-1870s and early-1880s. Prince Alfred was stationed at Royal Naval Dockyard, Halifax from time to time between 1878 and 1883, as Commander of the Royal Navy's North Atlantic Squadron. Prince George of Wales (later George V) was stationed in the Maritimes in 1882 as a midshipman on HMS Cumberland. During his time there, he drove the last spike into Newfoundland's first railway, the Harbour Grace Railway.

==== Princess as the viceregal consort (1878–1883) ====
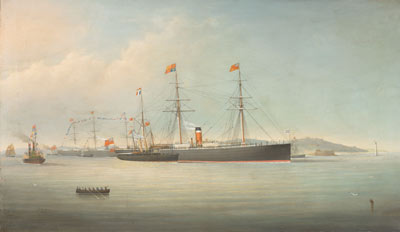
SS Sarmatian departs for Canada, carrying Princess Louise and the Marquess of Lorne in November 1878.

In 1878, Benjamin Disraeli, the prime minister of the United Kingdom, requested the Marquess of Lorne be appointed the next governor general of Canada, with his wife, Princess Louise, to be viceregal consort. Disraeli's nomination of Lord Lorne was largely motivated by his desire to see a member of the royal family reside in Canada for an extended period. Prior to his appointment as the Canadian governor general, Lord Lorne was virtually unknown to the public, with little concrete record of public service. The attraction for appointing Lord Lorne to the office was having his spouse, Princess Louise, reside in Canada.

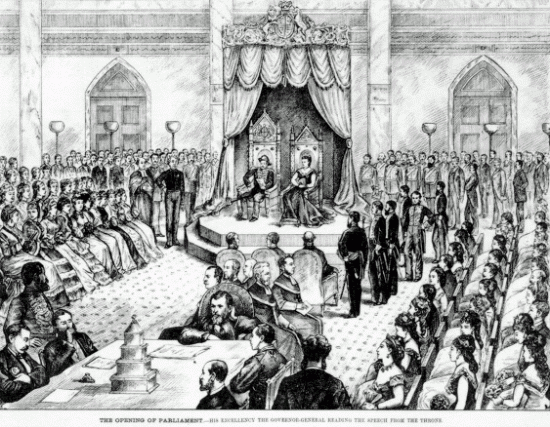
Princess Louise accompanies the Marquess of Lorne, the governor general of Canada, during the opening the 4th Canadian Parliament, 1879.

Arriving in Canada on 23 November 1878, the viceregal couple was greeted by Prince Alfred, who was a Royal Navy officer stationed in Halifax. Lord Lorne was formally sworn in as the governor general in Province House, Halifax, before they proceeded towards the capital, in Ottawa. Arriving in Ottawa on 2 December, the head of the Canadian ministry, John A. Macdonald, was not present at the viceregal welcome reception. Macdonald's absence from the welcome reception was depicted as a purposeful insult to the princess by the opposition Liberal Party. They took a private trip to Niagara Falls in January 1879, before returning to Ottawa to open the 4th Canadian Parliament, on 13 February 1879.

They undertook an official tour of Eastern Canada from mid-May 1879, touring Montreal during Victoria Day, awarding prizes to officer cadets of the Royal Military College of Canada in Kingston. On 9 June, they opened Terrasse Dufferin in Quebec City, and later laid the cornerstone of Porte Kent, gifted to the city from Queen Victoria. Following their tour of Quebec, they proceeded towards the Maritimes and Ontario. In Toronto, they opened the first Canadian National Exhibition, and attended the Queen's Plate. During their time in Ottawa, both Lord Lorne and Louise worked towards the creation of a national arts association, establishing the Royal Canadian Academy of Arts in 1880.

On 14 February 1880 in Ottawa, Princess Louise was injured when her horse-drawn sleigh turned over. Hitting her head on the metal frame of the sleigh, Louise suffered from neuralgia after the incident. The public was not made aware of the event, with the aide-de-camp to the governor general downplaying the incident to the press. She did not make another public appearance until April 1880. While recovering, she was visited by her brother Prince Leopold. Louise and Leopold privately toured Quebec, Ontario, and the American city of Chicago until 31 July 1880, when both returned to the United Kingdom.

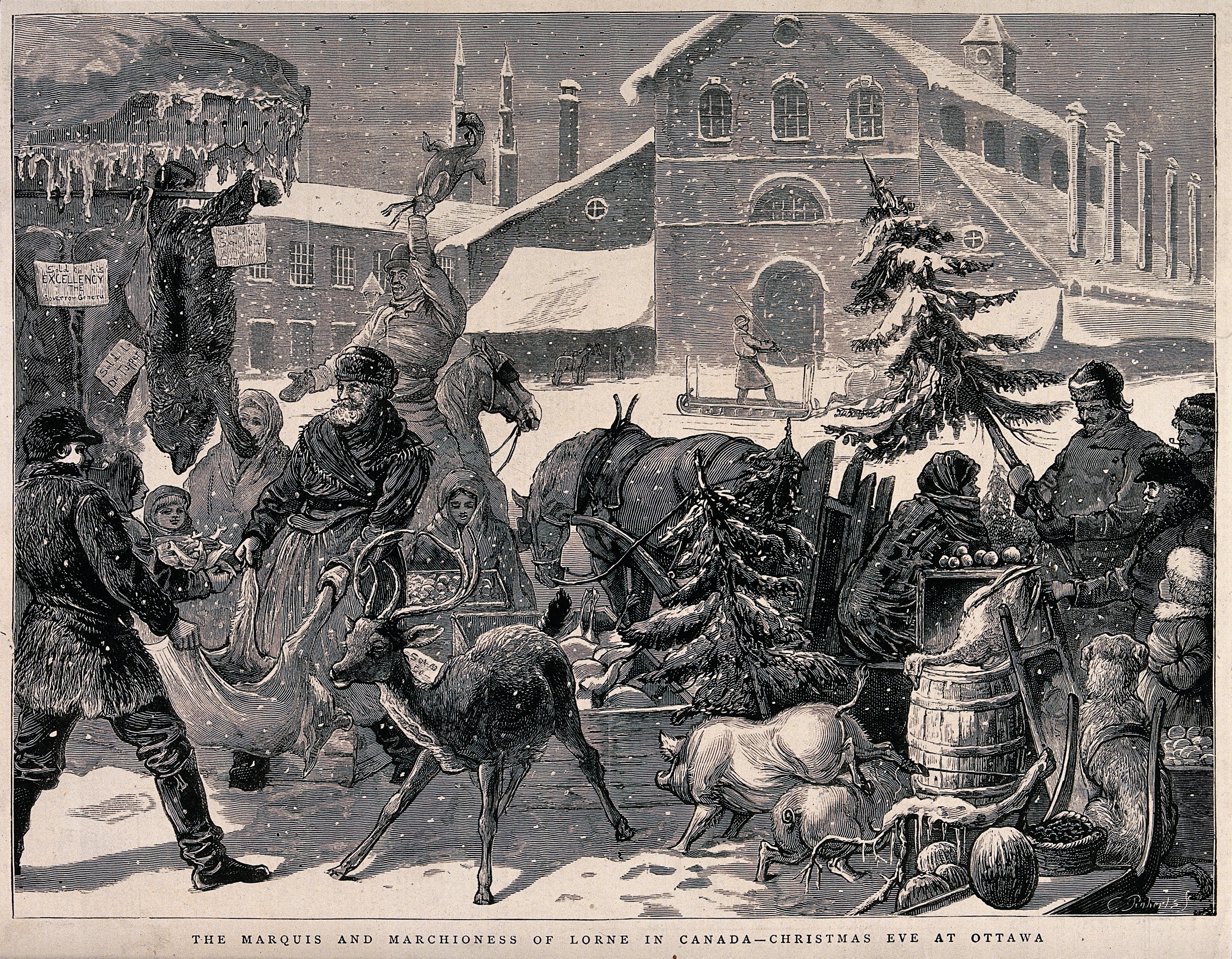
Princess Louise and the Marquess of Lorne visiting a street market in Ottawa around Christmas, c. 1880s.

During Lord Lorne's 1881 tour of the North-West Territories, he proposed a district of the territory be named Alberta after his wife (whose full name was Louise Caroline Alberta). Similarly, Princess Louise was the one who proposed the name for Regina, from the Latin word for 'queen'.

Louise returned to Canada until 4 June 1882, although rumors of a Fenian plot against her forced her to remain in the Citadelle of Quebec, a military installation used by the Canadian militia, and the secondary residence for the Monarch, and the governor general. On 30 August, Lord Lorne and Louise set out for an official tour of British Columbia, visiting Victoria, and meeting with a First Nations delegation in New Westminster. Louise remained in Victoria as Lord Lorne continued with the official tour into the British Columbia Interior. They remained in the province until 7 December 1882, with their tour extended to counter secessionist sentiments in the province, a result of the federal government's failure to produce a transcontinental rail link by 1881. Robert Beaven, the premier of British Columbia was said to have suggested the province secede from Canada, and establish an independent kingdom with Louise as its queen. The resulting crisis had spurred Lord Lorne to push the Canadian government to hasten the development of the Canadian Pacific Railway.

Louise was visited by another member of the royal family, Prince George of Wales, in April 1883. Shortly before the end of his fifth year as governor general, Lord Lorne declined an option to serve the position for another year. His decision to turn down an additional year in office was questioned by some, with Queen Victoria suspecting that Lord Lorne was jealous of Louise's popularity with Canadians, in contrast to his own. The Marquess and Princess Louise concluded their term in Canada with a farewell tours in Montreal, and Toronto, leaving for the United Kingdom from Quebec City on 27 October 1883.

=== 1884–1900 ===
In 1890, Prince Arthur conducted another tour of Canada, arriving in British Columbia from his earlier service with the British Army in the British Raj. During this tour, he travelled east towards the Maritimes, primarily by railway, before continuing on to the United Kingdom.

Princess Marie Louise arrived in Canada in 1900 to tour the country, however controversy surrounding her spouse, Prince Aribert of Anhalt forced her to return to the United Kingdom shortly after her arrival. After Prince Aribert was found in bed with another man, his father, Frederick I, Duke of Anhalt, accused Marie Louise of indecency, claiming that his son was denied his conjugal rights. Marie Louise was at Rideau Hall when the governor general gave her two telegrams instructing her to return to the United Kingdom immediately. Her marriage with Prince Aribert was annulled in December 1900, with his father using his prerogative as a reigning Duke of Anhalt to annul the marriage.

== Early 20th century (1901–1950) ==
=== 1900s ===
==== 1901 royal tour ====
Prince George in Montreal and Quebec City. He visited most of the provinces during his 1901 royal tour.

The first royal tour after the death of Queen Victoria was conducted by the second son of the reigning king, Prince George, Duke of Cornwall and York (later George V), his spouse, Mary, Duchess of Cornwall and York (later Queen Mary), and the duchess's brother, Prince Alexander of Teck (later the Earl of Athlone). The tour in Canada formed a part of a larger eight-month royal tour of the British Empire that began on 16 March 1901, with the duke and duchess's departure from Portsmouth, United Kingdom. In Canada alone, the royal party crossed some 80,500 kilometres (50,000 miles).

The Canadian portion of the tour was originally planned to begin in British Columbia, proceeding eastward through the country. However, after South Africa was added onto the royal tour, the decision was made to begin to the royal tour in Quebec City, and conclude it in Halifax. As the period of court mourning for Queen Victoria's death had not yet expired during their time in Canada, public balls, banquets, and levees planned for the royal tour were cancelled, with only official dinners, concerts, receptions, and reviews taking place. During the tour, Prince George kept a methodical record of his activities, recording that he shook the hands of 24,855 people at official receptions; received 544 addresses; laid 21 cornerstones; gave 100 speeches; and presented 4,329 medals.

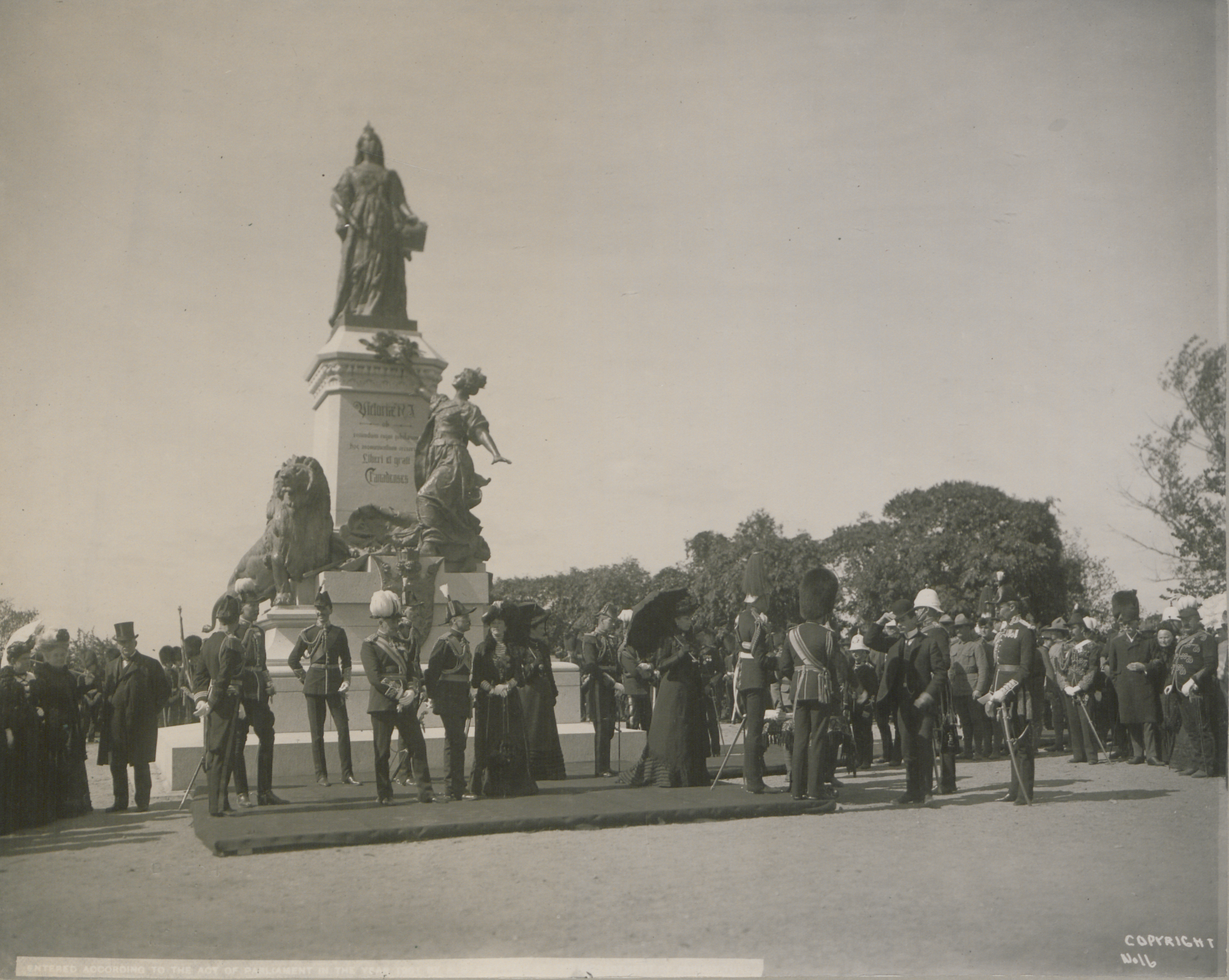
Presentation of Boer War medals in Ottawa by Prince George during his 1901 tour.

The Canadian portion of the 1901 royal tour began 16 September 1901, when the RMS Ophir arrived in Quebec City. The royal party – which consisted of 22 people, landed at Quebec City on 16 September. During his time in Quebec City, Prince George invested Lieutenant Richard Turner with the Victoria Cross for his conduct during the Battle of Leliefontein in a ceremony at the Plains of Abraham, and spoke to students at the Université Laval. Moving west of Quebec City by railway, the group made stops to Montreal, and Ottawa. Throughout the royal tour, Prince George placed an emphasis on praising the creation and expansion of the country during his own lifetime, giving a speech about the country's development and growth in Ottawa and Winnipeg.

In Ottawa, Prince George dedicated the Alexandra Bridge in Ottawa, rode a timber slide, and watched the lacrosse final for the Minto Cup, a match he enjoyed so much he kept the ball that was used. Departing from Ottawa, they passed through Ontario, creating "incredible excitement seldom seen since the visit of his father in 1860." The duke and duchess arrived in Manitoba where the former opened the new science building at the University of Manitoba, and then to Regina in the North-West Territories. In Calgary, they met with First Nations chiefs and viewed exhibitions, before concluding their western-leg of their tour in Vancouver and Victoria. They group then turned back again towards Banff, where the duchess went to Tunnel Mountain and Lake Louise, while the duke went to Poplar Point.

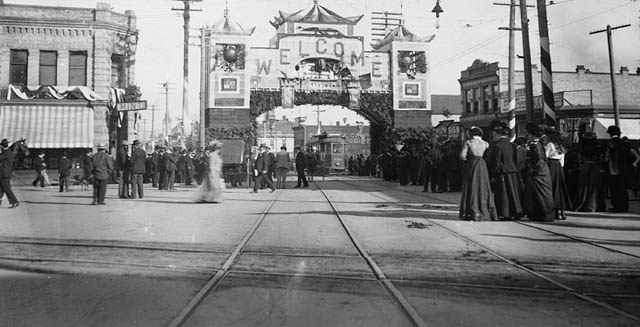
A triumphal welcome arch for Prince George in Chinatown, Vancouver.

After passing back through Regina, they reunited in Toronto, welcomed by the Toronto Mendelssohn Choir, and attended concerts at Massey Hall. They proceeded to tour throughout Southern Ontario, before returning to Montreal, where the duke opened the newly rebuilt Victoria Bridge. The Canadian tour ended with a trip through Saint John, and their departure from Halifax. Following their departure from Halifax, the global royal tour proceeded towards Newfoundland, a separate colony not associated with Canada at the time.

==== Tercentenary of Quebec City (1908) ====
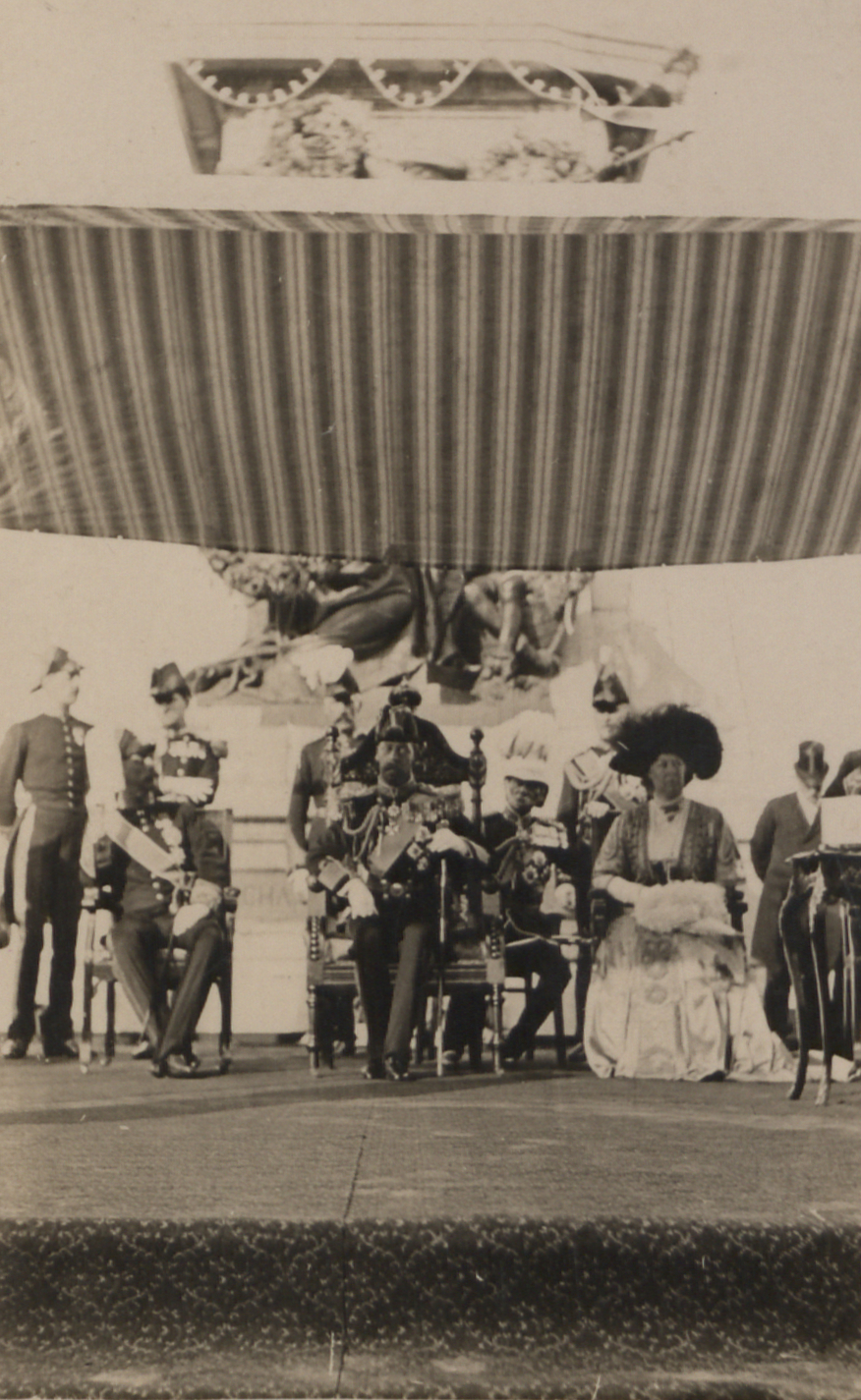
George, Prince of Wales, attending a military review for the Canadian militia, 1908

In 1908 the Canadian government asked King Edward VII to preside over the tercentenary celebrations for the founding of Quebec City. Edward VII would accept the invitation on behalf of his son, George, Prince of Wales (later George V). The prince of Wales arrived at Quebec City aboard the Royal Navy cruiser, HMS Indomitable. Unlike his earlier tour in 1901, his royal tour in 1908 was limited to the ceremony in Quebec City, as well as a military review of the Canadian militia on the Plains of Abraham.

=== 1910s ===
Several members of the royal family toured Canada during the 1910s. In 1913, Prince Albert (later George VI) conducted his first royal tour of the Canada, as well as Newfoundland, while serving aboard the Royal Navy cruiser HMS Cumberland.

==== Prince Arthur as governor general ====
From 1911 to 1916, Prince Arthur, Duke of Connaught and Strathearn was Canada's governor general, with the duchess of Connaught and Strathearn serving as his viceregal consort. The duke was the first member of the royal family to take the office of Governor General of Canada. Originally his appointment was for only two years, although at the request of Robert Borden, the prime minister of Canada, his tenure was later extended to five years. The duke, duchess, and their daughter, Princess Patricia of Connaught, arrived in Quebec City on 13 October 1911 and the duke was later sworn into office at the Parliament of Quebec. Several weeks after being sworn in, he presided over the opening of the Parliament of Canada in Ottawa.

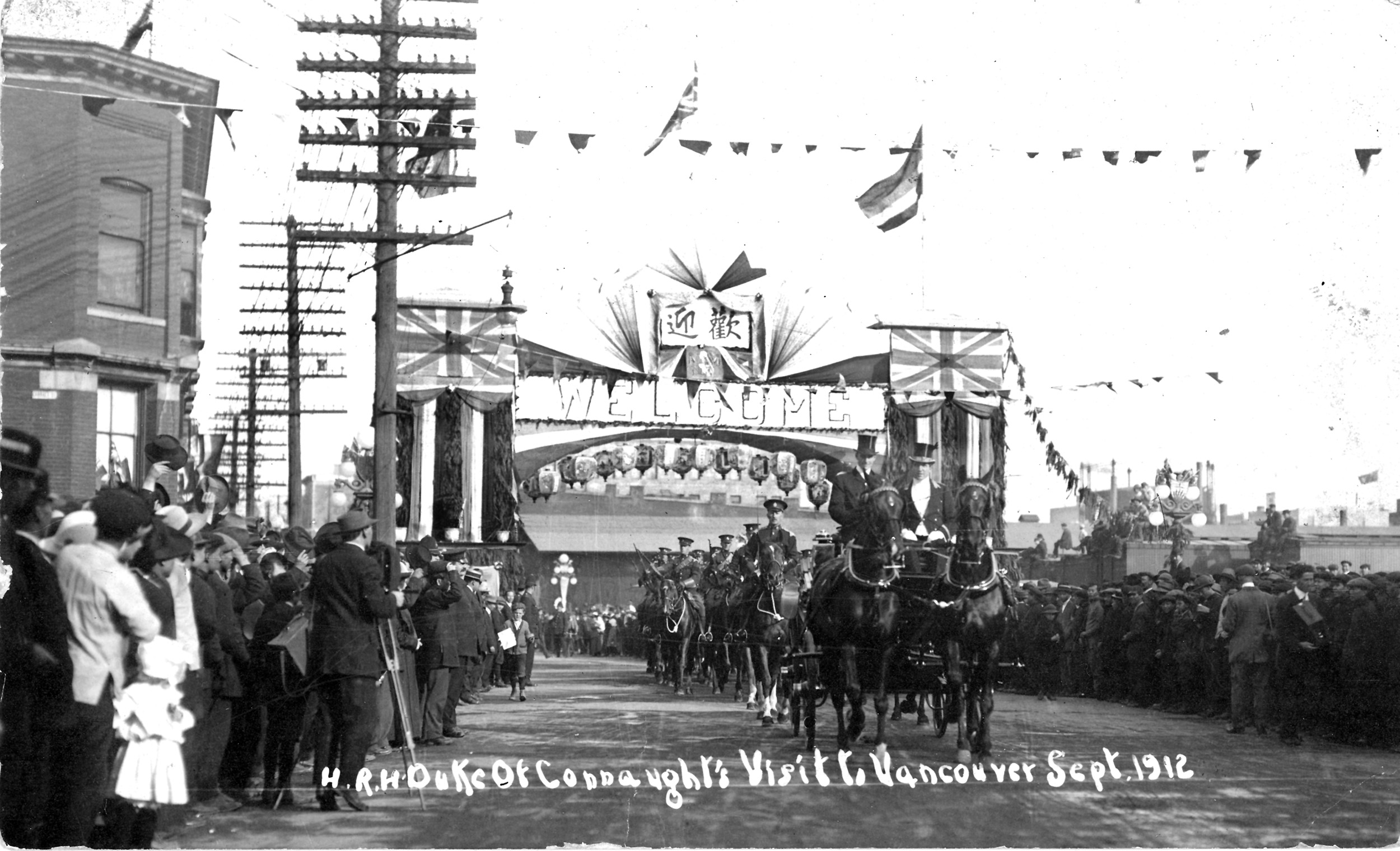
Prince Arthur touring Vancouver as the governor general of Canada, 1911.

The duke and duchess conducted their first tour as Governor General and consort in 1911, visiting Toronto, Hamilton, Kingston, and finally Montreal on 27 November 1911. Further tours with the duke, and Princess Patricia, were undertaken in May 1912, to Winnipeg and the Maritimes. On 28 August 1912, the duke, the duchess, and their daughter conducted a tour of the west, visiting Sault Ste. Marie, Saskatoon, Prince Albert, Edmonton, Calgary, Banff, Vancouver, Prince Rupert, and Victoria, where they inspected personnel of the Royal Canadian Navy at Esquimalt Royal Navy Dockyard. They then visited Medicine Hat, Regina, and Brandon, before concluding their tour in Toronto and Ottawa.

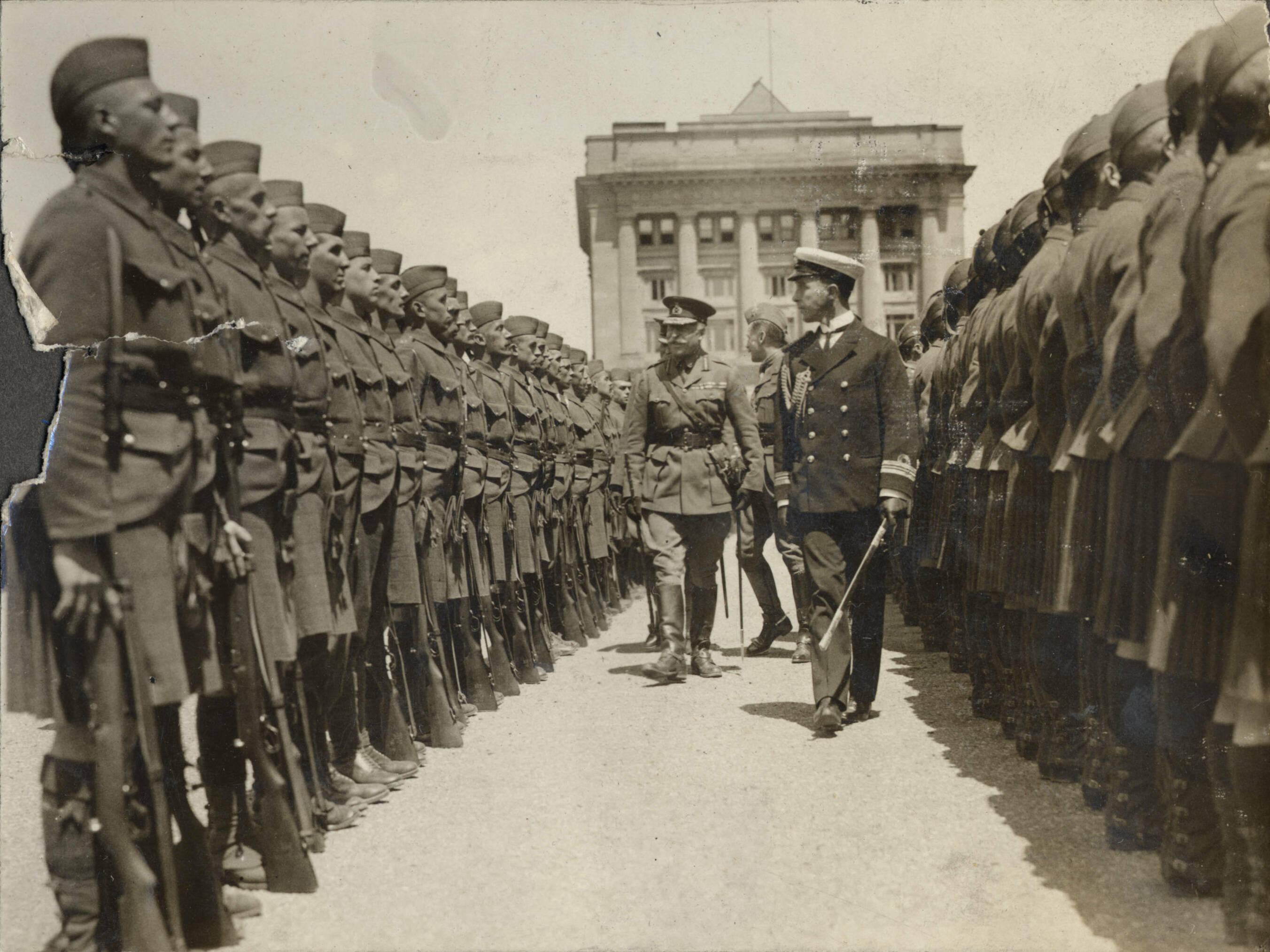
Prince Arthur inspects members of the Canadian Expeditionary Force at Valcartier base in 1914.

While serving as the governor general, the duke inaugurated the Saskatchewan Legislative Building, and laid the cornerstone for the Cathedral of St. John the Evangelist in Regina, and for the new Provincial Library at the British Columbia Parliament Buildings. The duke returned to Banff on two occasions, in August 1914 and May 1916. In addition to Canada, he also visited Newfoundland, a separate dominion of the British Empire, in 1914.

In January 1913, the duchess was hospitalized as a result of her declining health, and the viceregal family returned to London, UK, in March 1913. During this period, the duke continued to serve as governor general, and received regular correspondence from Borden by telegraph. After the duchess recovered, the family returned to Canada in October 1913. During World War I, the duke was involved in recruitment, and raising the morale of soldiers. Princess Patricia worked for the Canadian Red Cross, and continued working for a Canadian hospital in Orpington, UK, after her father's term as Governor General ended in 1916. Several months after Centre Block on Parliament Hill was ravaged by a fire, the duke laid the memorial cornerstone for its replacement on 1 September 1916. The duke's tenure as governor general ended on 16 October 1916.

==== 1919 royal tour ====
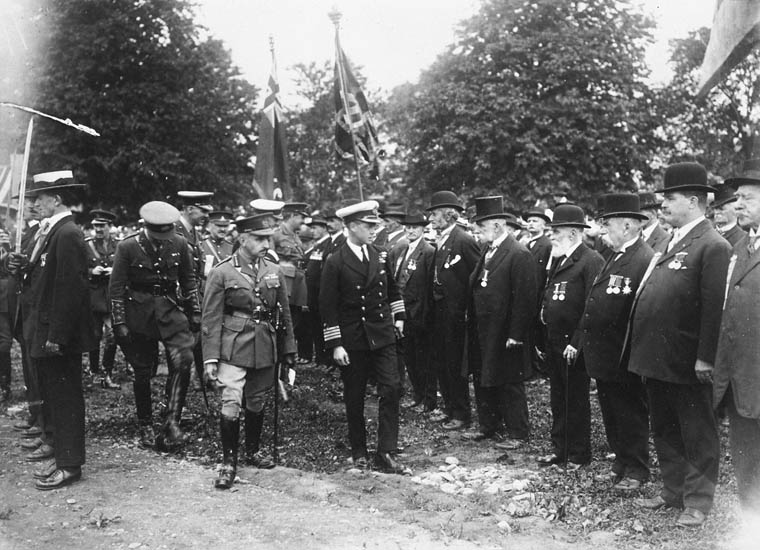
Edward, Prince of Wales inspecting veterans in Halifax, 1919

After the end of World War I in November 1918, Edward, Prince of Wales (later Edward VIII) set out to develop his role as the prince of Wales through a tour of the Empire, with his first tour occurring in the dominions of Newfoundland and Canada in 1919. Organization for the tour was undertaken by Joseph Pope, the assistant clerk to the Privy Council for Canada. Unlike earlier tours, the 1919 royal tour dropped the rigid formalities of earlier tours, partly due to authorities' inability to control the crowds who came to see the prince. The informality of the tour was matched by the prince of Wales, whose informal dress, and mannerisms had struck the right note with Canadians.

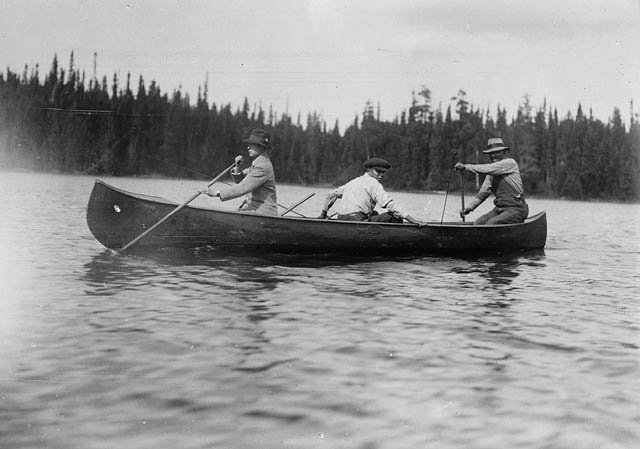
The prince of Wales and two Ojibwe guides on the Nipigon River

Arriving at St John's, Newfoundland aboard HMS Renown, on 5 August 1919, Edward proceeded to Saint John, Halifax, and Charlottetown, and, on 21 August 1919, Quebec City. In Ontario, he laid the foundation stone of the Peace Tower on Parliament Hill, met with the League of Canadian Indians at Sault Ste Marie, and took a three-day canoe trip down the Nipigon River to fish and hunt with two Ojibwa guides. On 26 August, he inaugurated Warriors' Day at the Canadian National Exhibition.

He then travelled to Regina, where he renamed a library the Prince of Wales Library. He then proceeded towards Vancouver, toured the area, attended a civic reception and military ball, as well as opening the New Westminster Exhibition. The prince also went on to Victoria, where he laid the foundation stone of a statue of Queen Victoria on the grounds of the British Columbia Parliament Buildings. Of the Canadian west, Edward wrote, "the free, vigorous, hopeful spirit of westerners not only inspires me, but makes me feel happy and at home."

=== 1920s and 1930s ===
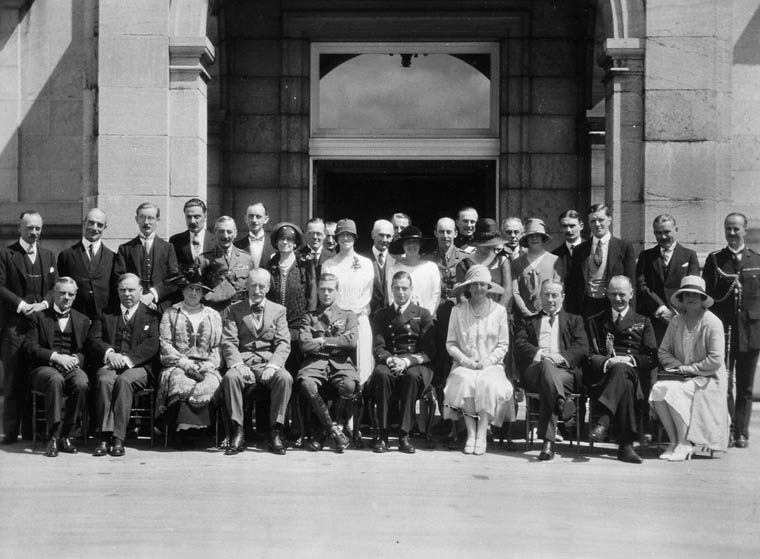
Edward, Prince of Wales, and Prince George at Rideau Hall (seated, fifth and sixth from the left, respectively), during their 1927 tour.

In 1923, the Prince of Wales was in Canada to visit, and to work on his privately owned ranch near Calgary, E.P. Ranch. He arrived at Quebec City on 12 September, and stopped in Ottawa and Winnipeg before reaching the ranch. He made another private visit to his ranch in 1924, as well as touring as well various towns and cities; in 1924 he stopped at Rideau Hall for various official functions, and again frustrated his staff by disappearing for dancing and golf.

In 1926, the brother of the Prince of Wales, Prince George (later Duke of Kent), arrived in Canada and actively took part in squash, badminton, and tennis games played in Rideau Hall's Tent Room; the governor general, The Marquess of Willingdon, said of the prince: "Such a nice boy, but shy, & as mad on exercise as the P. of W." Prince George, along with the prince of Wales, conducted another royal tour of Canada in 1927. During the tour, the two princes opened Union Station and the Princes' Gates in Toronto.

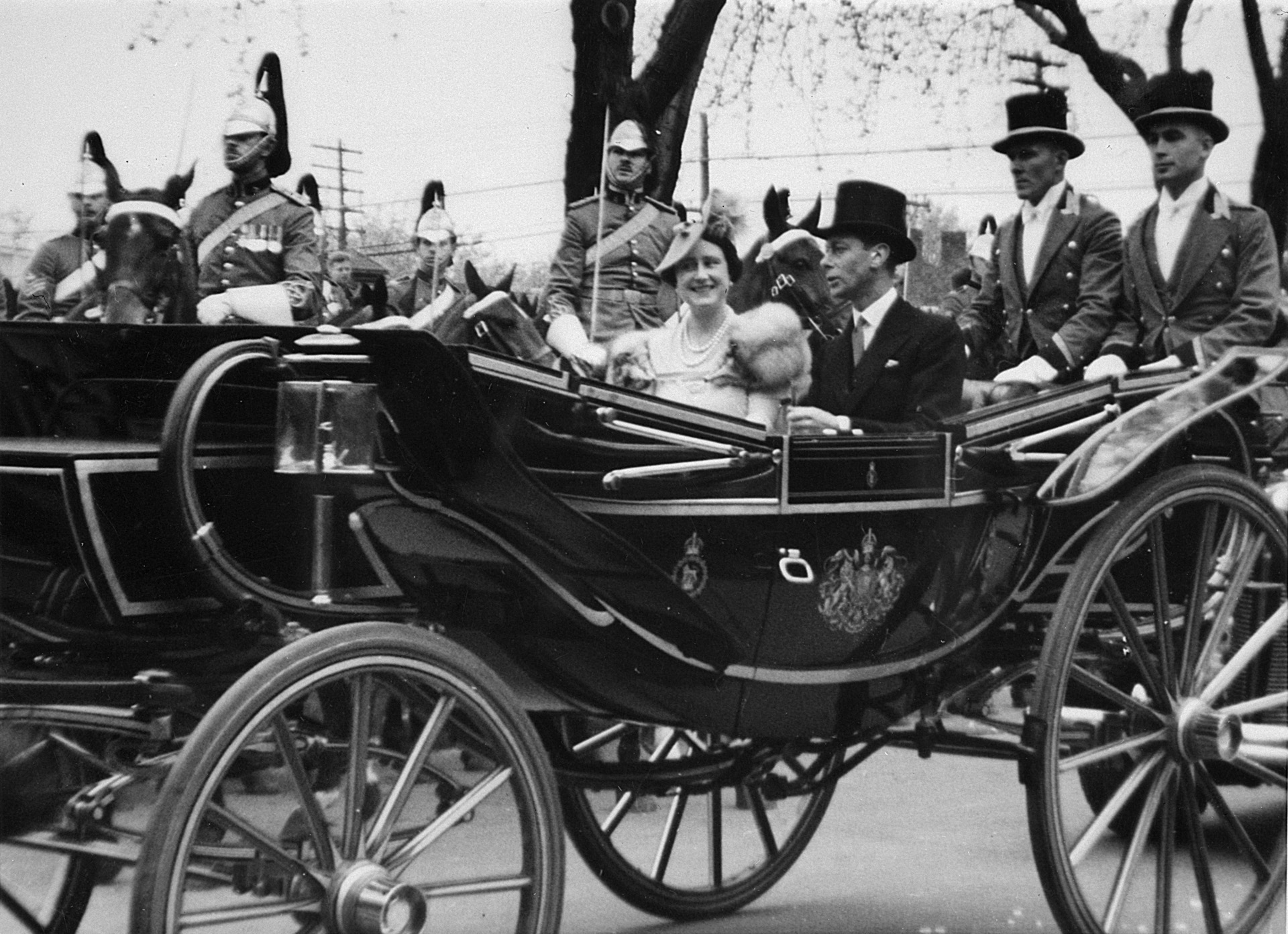
King George VI and Queen Elizabeth visit the King's Plate in Toronto during the 1939 royal tour.

The 1939 royal tour was a cross-Canada royal tour by King George VI and Queen Elizabeth. Although there had been many invitations since 1858 for the reigning monarch to tour Canada, George was the first to do so. (In 1926, Queen Marie of Romania also visited the country.) The tour helped unify the nation by providing a shared identity and history.

During another Canadian tour in 1985, Queen Elizabeth, then the Queen Mother, stated in a speech, "it is now some 46 years since I first came to this country with the King, in those anxious days shortly before the outbreak of the Second World War. I shall always look back upon that visit with feelings of affection and happiness. I think I lost my heart to Canada and Canadians and my feelings have not changed with the passage of time."

=== 1940s ===
Princess Alice, Countess of Athlone, resided in Canada from June 1940 to April 1946 as the viceregal consort of Canada; accompanying her spouse, Alexander, Earl of Athlone, who was sworn in as the governor general of Canada on 21 June 1940.

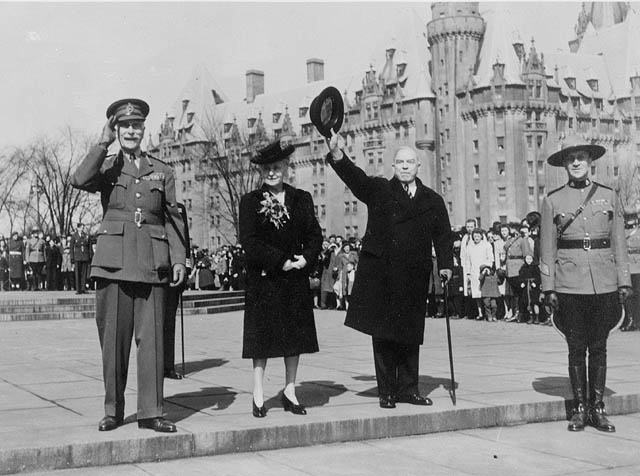
Princess Alice, Countess of Athlone, with the Earl of Athlone and William Lyon Mackenzie King, March 1946

Another royal relative, Alastair, Duke of Connaught and Strathearn, resided in Canada from 1940 as the aide-de-camp to the governor general. On 23 April 1943, Alastair was found dead on the floor of his room at Rideau Hall. He had died from hypothermia. Newspapers at the time cited the cause of death as "natural causes."

In 1941, Prince George, Duke of Kent visited several Royal Canadian Air Force bases in Canada. In the same year, Edward, the duke of Windsor (formerly Edward VIII) visited Canada to stay at his private ranch in Alberta. He entered Canada at North Portal, before proceeding towards Calgary the next day. As the visit was only few years removed from the 1936 abdication crisis, he was initially discouraged from visiting by the Canadian prime minister, William Lyon Mackenzie King. However, King would later send Edward a telegram welcoming him shortly after he entered the country. Edward departed Canada after spending nine days there, summoned back to the Bahamas as its governor, after a hurricane struck the islands. Edward would visit Canada on two more occasions, visiting New Brunswick in 1945, and Alberta in 1950. During his time in Alberta, Edward slept at the viceregal suite of the Palliser Hotel in Calgary; as the state of his ranch had deteriorated in the years since his last visit. In 1945, Edward sought the appointment as the governor general of Canada, although failed to obtain it.

By 1945, Sir Alan Lascelles, the private secretary of George VI, and Sir Shuldham Redfern, Secretary to the Governor General of Canada, were discussing the idea of the king making regular flights to Canada to open parliament and perform other constitutional and ceremonial duties. The notion was eventually forgotten.

== Late 20th century (1951–2000) ==
=== Elizabeth II ===
Elizabeth II conducted 20 official tours of Canada from 1951 to 2000. She first toured Canada in 1951, as Princess Elizabeth, Duchess of Edinburgh. In her subsequent tours of the country, she toured it as the queen of Canada. In addition to official tours, in the 20th century, the queen made nine stopovers in Canada, to refuel her aircraft.

==== 1950s ====
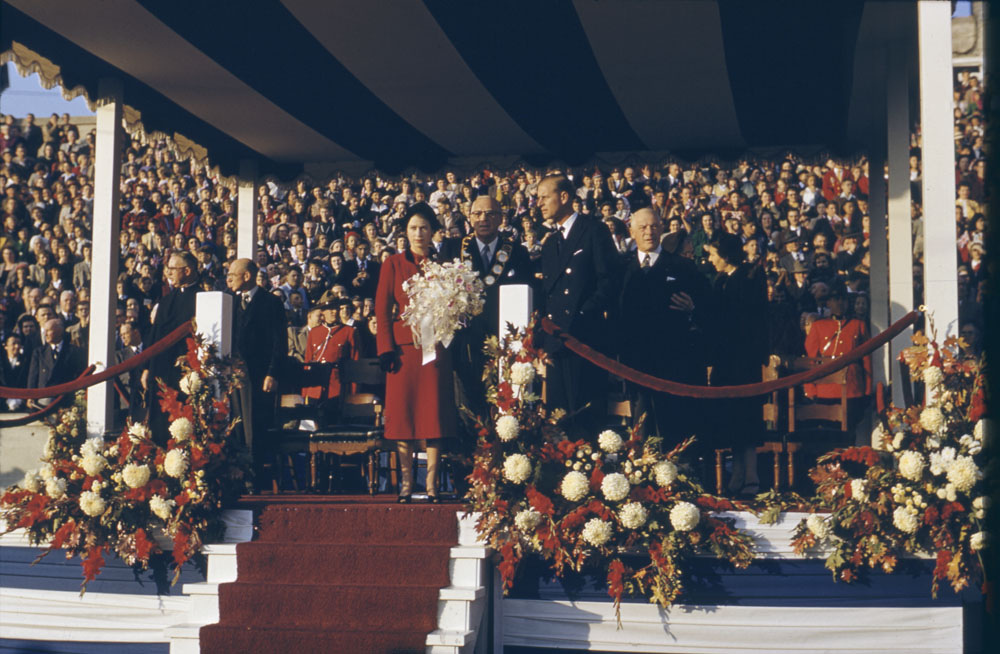
Princess Elizabeth, along with the duke of Edinburgh, during their 1951 royal tour

Princess Elizabeth, Duchess of Edinburgh, and her husband, the Duke of Edinburgh, made their first appearance in every Canadian province (including Newfoundland, the newest) in 1951, on behalf of her ailing father. In Toronto, she took in a Toronto Maple Leafs game at Maple Leaf Gardens and greeted Ontarians at numerous official functions. In New Brunswick the princess and duke arrived at Fredericton's Union Station on 6 November, greeted by both Lieutenant Governor David Laurence MacLaren and hundreds of well-wishers, and moved on to tour the University of New Brunswick, Christ Church Cathedral, and the Legislative Assembly Building. It was then on to Saint John, where the royal couple travelled in a motorcade watched by some 60,000 people, visited a veterans' hospital, and attended a civic dinner at the Admiral Beatty Hotel, where the silver flatware designed specifically for the 1939 visit of the king was used. After an overnight on the royal train, Princess Elizabeth and the duke of Edinburgh made whistle-stops in Moncton and Sackville before departing the province. The National Film Board of Canada produced the documentary Royal Journey, which chronicles the 1951 royal tour.

In 1953, during a brief stop-over for refueling in Gander, Newfoundland, the Queen decided, after being roused from sleep at 3:20 am by their singing of "For She's a Jolly Good Fellow", to address the crowd gathered outside.

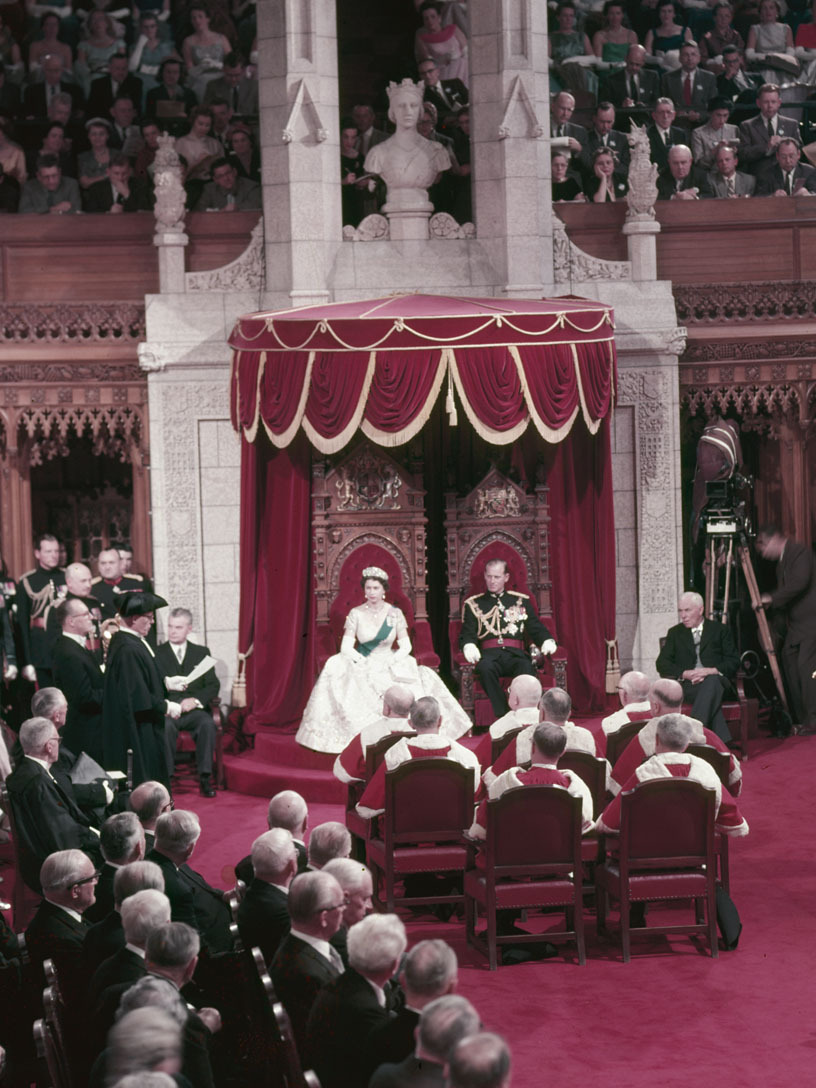
Queen Elizabeth II and Prince Philip at the opening of the 23rd Canadian Parliament, 14 October 1957

Elizabeth returned to Canada in 1957, there giving her first ever live television address, appointing her husband to her Canadian Privy Council at a meeting which she chaired, and on 14 October, opening the first session of the 23rd parliament. About 50,000 people descended on Parliament Hill to witness the arrival of the monarch. Due to the financial austerity of the times, the pageantry was muted in comparison to what would be seen at a similar event in the United Kingdom. June Callwood said in her coverage of the tour for Maclean's: "The Queen's role in Canada, it appeared to some observers, hinged on calculated pageantry, just enough to warm the pride of Canadians who revere tradition and stateliness above state but not so much as to antagonize those who consider royalty a blindingly off-colour bauble in an age of lean fear." In Saskatchewan, the queen inaugurated the natural gas-fired Queen Elizabeth Power Station on the South Saskatchewan River.

Two years later, the Queen returned and toured every province and territory; Buckingham Palace officials and the Canadian government opted to dub this a "royal tour", as opposed to a "royal visit", to dispel any notion that the queen was a visiting foreigner. Controversy arose in the run-up to the visit when CBC personality Joyce Davidson, while being interviewed by Dave Garroway on NBC's Today Show, said that as an "average Canadian" she was "pretty indifferent" to the queen's forthcoming visit. Davidson received some support, but, was mostly criticized for her comment. Regardless, the queen toured the entire country, specifically directing that events she attended should be public, rather than closed luncheons or receptions; further, popular Canadian athletic stars were invited to royal events for the first time, so that during her tour the queen met with Jean Béliveau, Sam Etcheverry, Maurice Richard, Punch Imlach, and Bud Grant. Hundreds of thousands of people turned out in Ontario, Manitoba, and Saskatchewan to see Elizabeth and Philip.

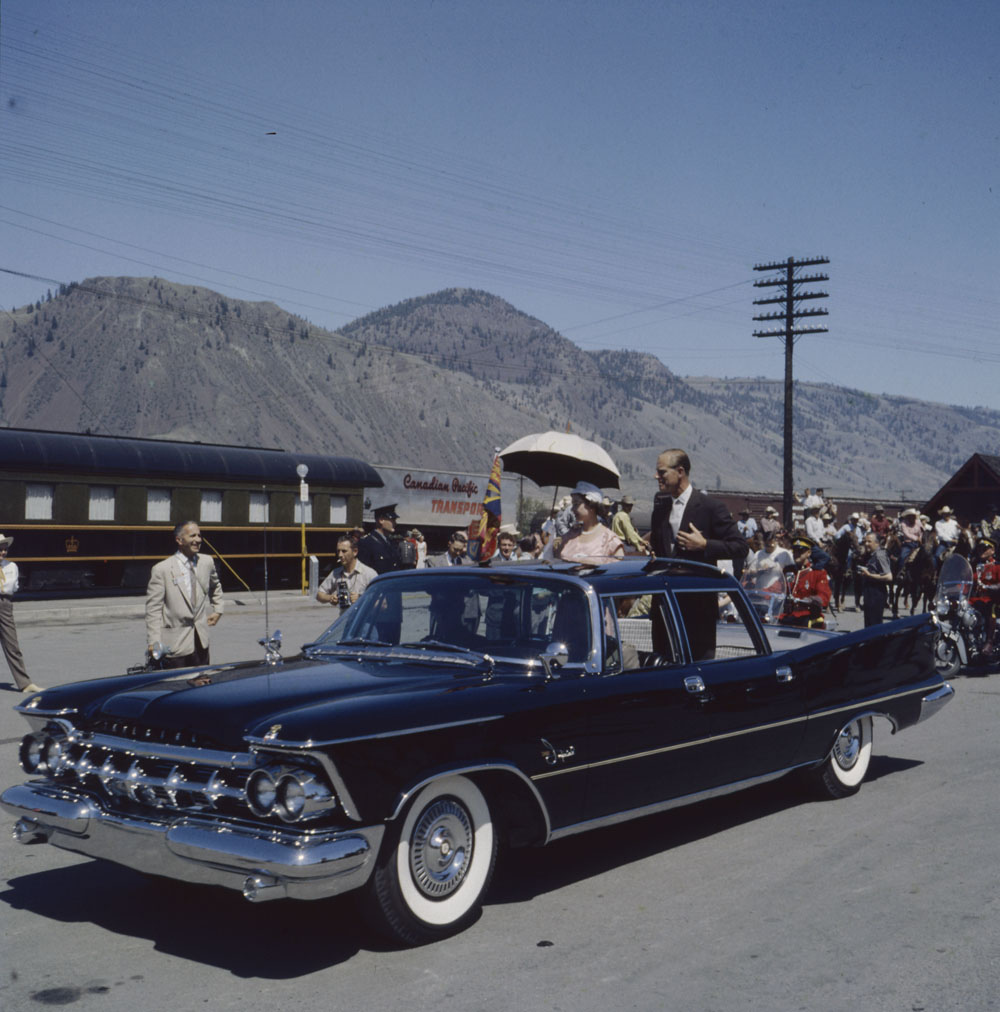
Elizabeth II and Prince Philip riding in a convertible through Kamloops during the 1959 tour

One of the most important events of this trip was the official opening of the St. Lawrence Seaway, along with President Dwight D. Eisenhower, where, in Prescott, Ontario, the Queen made her first live appearance on Canadian television. During this tour, the Queen paid numerous visits to Canadian industries, and again made a visit to the United States as Canada's head of state, stopping in Chicago and Washington, D.C., with Diefenbaker as her attending minister. The prime minister insisted that the queen be accompanied at all times by a Canadian Cabinet minister, being determined to make it clear to Americans that the Queen was visiting the United States as the Canadian monarch, and that "it is the Canadian embassy and not the British Embassy officials who are in charge" of the queen's itinerary. Her speeches in Chicago, written by her Canadian ministers, stressed steadily the fact that she had come to call as Queen of Canada. In this vein, the Queen hosted the return dinner for Eisenhower at the Canadian Embassy in Washington.

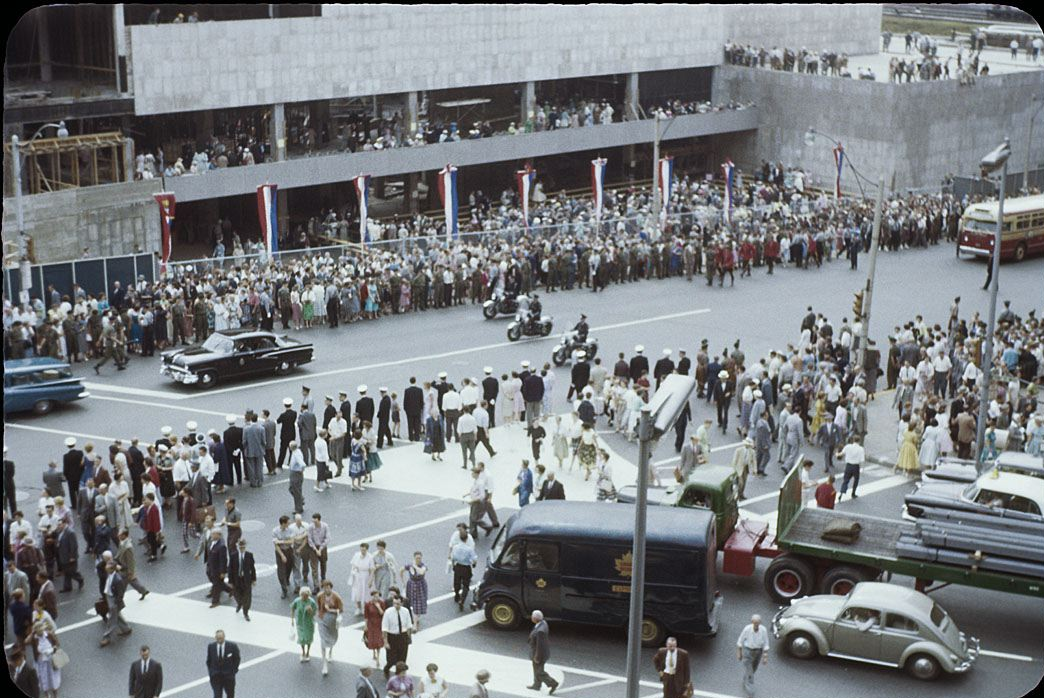
Motorcade of the Queen at the intersection of Yonge and Front Street, Toronto, during her 1959 tour.

The Queen returned to New Brunswick, at the end of her pan-Canada tour. The sovereign presided over a Queen's Scout recognition ceremony in Fredericton, visited the veterans' hospital in Lancaster, and undertook a walkabout in Victoria Park, Moncton. At Pointe-du-Chêne, the royal couple visited briefly with the families of fishermen who had died the previous month in a storm off Escuminac, making a donation to the New Brunswick Fisherman's Disaster Fund that was established in honour of the deceased.

Unknown to all involved, the Queen was pregnant with her third child. Prime Minister Diefenbaker urged her to cut the tour short after her disclosure to him at Kingston, Ontario, but the Queen swore him to secrecy and continued the journey, leaving the public announcement of the upcoming birth until she returned to London.

Once the news was released, criticism of the tour that had simmered during its progress unleashed in full: Diefenbaker was blamed for pushing the Queen to carry on a grueling continent-wide trip, and the brevity of stops necessary to complete such a journey, combined with the formality and inaccessibility of events, led to calls for a cease to that format of royal tour. The Albertan stated: "The fact is that royalty has no roots in Canada. And if roots must be put down, they certainly should be of a different kind than those which are historically proper for Britain." Prior to the tour, the president of the Saint-Jean-Baptiste Society, with the support of the mayor of Quebec City, requested of the tour officials that, on the evening of Saint-Jean-Baptiste Day, Her Majesty light the main bonfire in celebration. Though the Queen did lay a wreath at the James Wolfe Monument on the Plains of Abraham, the Queen's Canadian Secretary at the time, Howard Graham, left the bonfire off the itinerary, leading to complaints.

Successes were also noted, especially in the Crown's assistance in entrenching the newly emerging Canadian identity; the Queen ensured that the Red Ensign (then Canada's de facto national flag) was flown on the royal yacht, and she stood to attention for the duration of each playing of "O Canada", the country's then still unofficial national anthem, sometimes even joining in the singing.

==== 1960 to 2000 ====
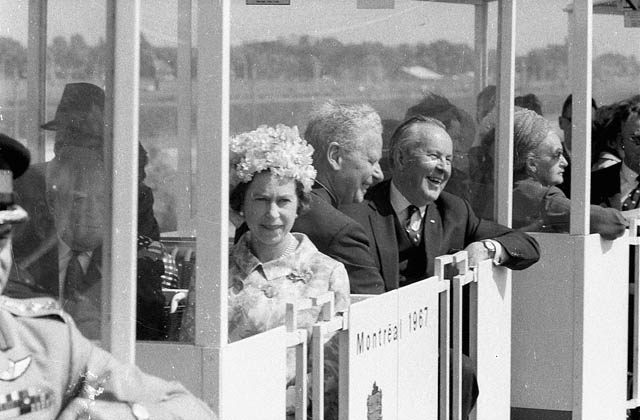
Elizabeh II riding the minirail at Expo 67 in Montreal.

Queen Elizabeth II also celebrated the centennial of the Confederation Conferences in Charlottetown on 6 October 1964. On 10 October, as she was touring the streets of Quebec City, a turbulent riot occurred and opposed anti-monarchist Quebec nationalists with the police. Since then, the event has been known as Samedi de la matraque ("Truncheon Saturday").

In 1971, the Queen was in British Columbia to celebrate the centennial of the province's entry into Confederation. She toured Alberta and Saskatchewan in July 1973, to celebrate the centennial of the Royal Canadian Mounted Police, opening the new RCMP museum building in Regina, and in 1978, to open the Commonwealth Games in Edmonton. In Saskatchewan, she dedicated Queen Elizabeth Court, in front of Regina's city hall.

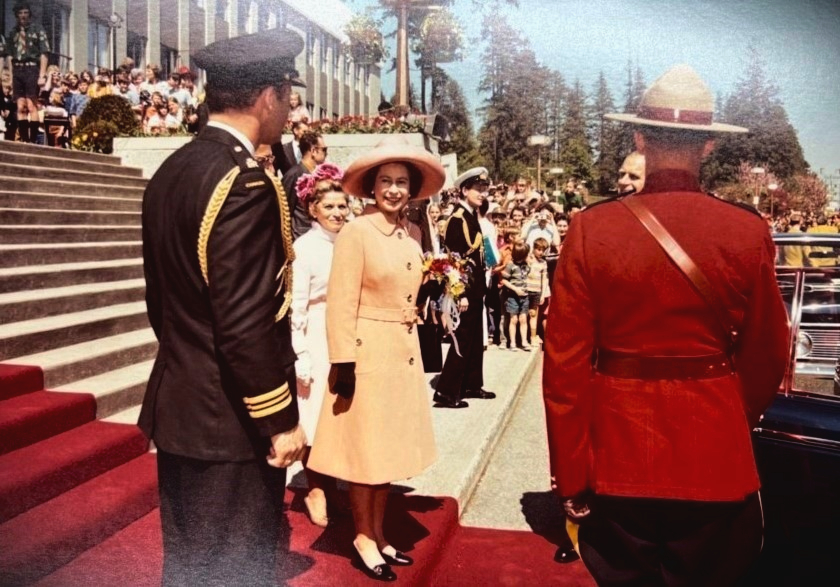
Elizabeth II at New Westminster City Hall during her 1971 tour of British Columbia.

From 28 June to 6 July 1976, Prince Charles, Prince Andrew and Prince Edward joined the queen and Prince Philip for the 1976 Olympic Games in Montreal. Princess Anne was a member of the British equestrian team competing in the Olympics in Montreal. The royal family also stopped by Nova Scotia and New Brunswick during the visit. The Queen arrived at Fredericton, New Brunswick, on 15 July, after which she travelled to Woolastook Provincial Park to visit the Boy Scout Jamboree campsite, picnicked with 3,500 schoolchildren, toured the Kings Landing Historical Settlement, and attended a provincial dinner with fireworks following. The Queen's second day in New Brunswick brought her to the Miramichi area, where she attended a provincial lunch, visited Chatham and Newcastle, and toured the Burchill Laminating Plant in Nelson-Miramichi.

In 1977, the Queen visited Canada as part of her Silver Jubilee. Her visit was designed both to burnish the image of the monarchy and to support Canadian national unity in the wake of the Parti Québécois's victory in the Quebec general election the previous year. As part of her visit, she personally delivered the speech from the throne for the second time in her reign. In the speech, she announced the Canadian government's intention to distance itself from the UK and assume more control over its own affairs, a process which ultimately led to the patriation of the Constitution via the Constitution Act of 1982.

The Queen also journeyed to New Brunswick to celebrate the province's bicentennial in 1984, touching down, along with Prince Philip, at Moncton airport on 24 September, from where the royal party travelled to Shediac, Sackville, Riverview, and Fredericton over the course of three days. While at the Legislative Building, the Queen issued a royal warrant augmenting the province's coat of arms with its present crest, supporters, compartment, motto. She also, when in Fredericton, unveiled a plaque in Wilmot Park that honoured Edward Wilmot and recounted the dedication of the park by the queen's great-grandfather. During the same tour, in Sudbury, Ontario, she presided over the official opening of Science North.

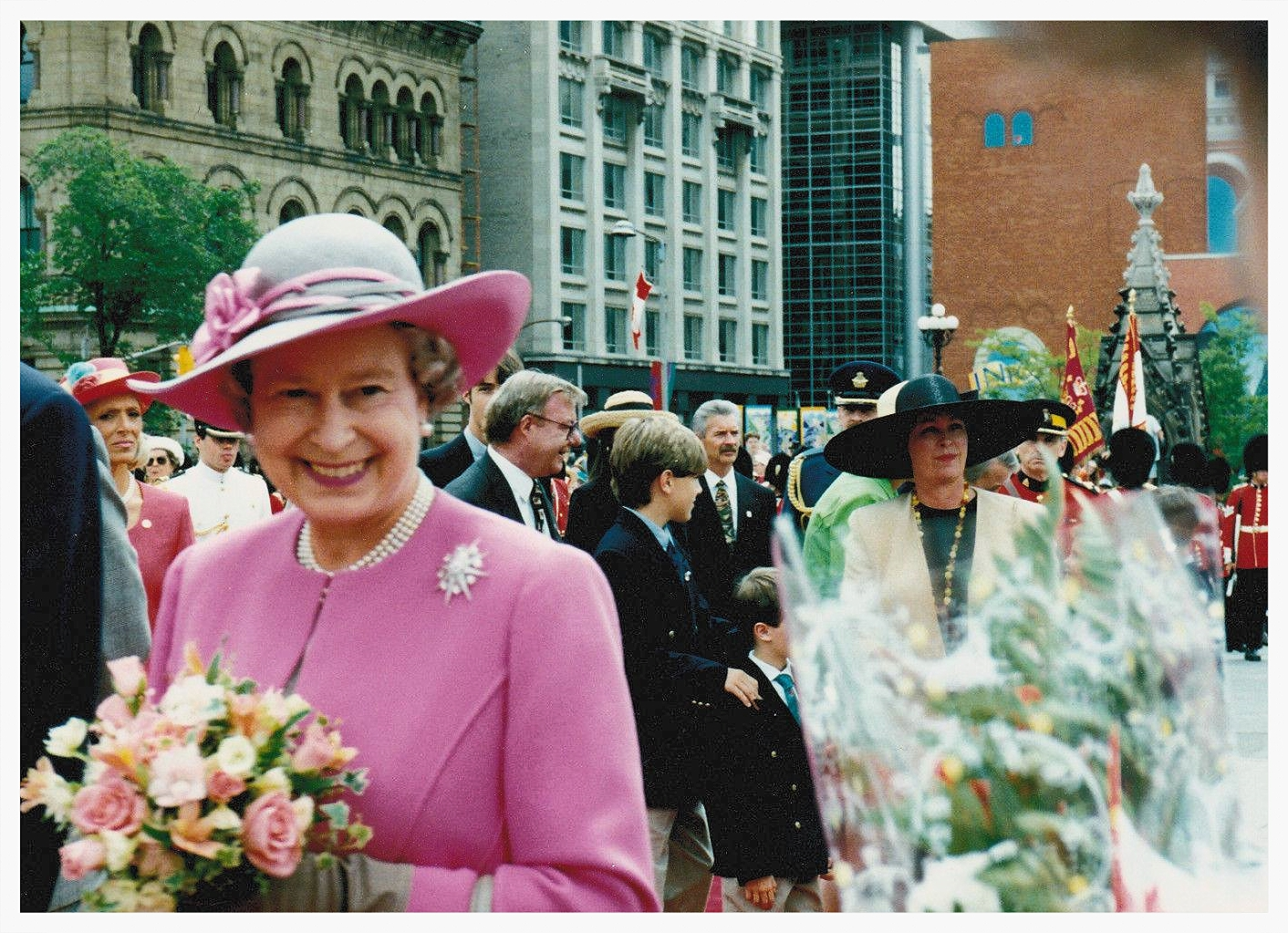
Elizabeth II attending Canada Day celebrations in 1992.

The Queen undertook a royal tour of Canada from 30 June to 3 July 1992 in order to preside over commemorations for the 125th anniversary of Canadian Confederation and her ruby jubilee. On 30 June, she unveiled an equestrian statue of herself at Parliament Hill in Ottawa. The statue is placed (though it is as of 2025 temporarily moved to Sussex Drive during the rehabilitation of the Centre Block) across from a statue of Queen Victoria, the first monarch of a federated Canada. On the same day, the Queen also unveiled two stained-glass windows at Rideau Hall, one to commemorate her ruby jubilee, the other to commemorate the 40th anniversary of the appointment of the first Canadian-born governor general. The following day, she presided over the swearing in of new members of the Queen's Privy Council of Canada, before presiding over official Canada Day celebrations on Parliament Hill.

The Queen opened the University of Northern British Columbia in 1994.

The Queen and Prince Philip visited Bonavista, Newfoundland, on 24 June 1997 to commemorate the 500th anniversary of John Cabot's landing in North America.

=== Philip, Duke of Edinburgh ===
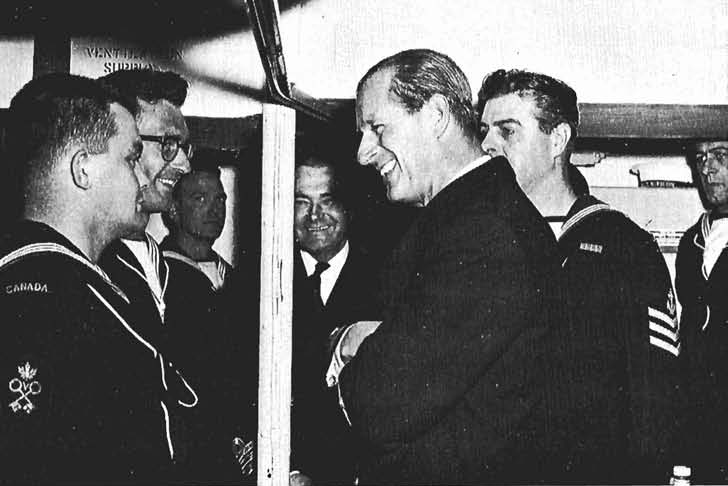
Prince Philip speaking with sailors onboard HMCS Nipigon during his 1964 tour.

Philip, Duke of Edinburgh, consort to Queen Elizabeth II, participated in a number of official tours of Canada during his lifetime, with his first tour occurring in 1951, accompanying his spouse, Princess Elizabeth. He made more than 70 visits to Canada, including 20 royal tours with Queen Elizabeth II. He travelled to Canada on his own on 46 occasions, typically as a private working tour where he served as a patron for awards and events such as the Commonwealth Study Conference and the Duke of Edinburgh Awards.

The Duke of Edinburgh visited Canada on two occasions to open two multi-sport event, the 1954 British Empire and Commonwealth Games, and the 1967 Pan American Games. The trip was one of many visits to Canada the Duke made without the Queen. Other visits without the Queen occurred in 1960, 1962, 1978, 1979, 1980, and 1998, as he was chairing the Commonwealth Study Conference, hosted in Canada during those years. He also made 11 trips to Canada in relation to The Duke of Edinburgh's Award. The duke also made several visits relating to his role with the Armed Forces. He was appointed the colonel-in-chief of the Royal Canadian Regiment on 8 December 1953 and presented the 3rd Battalion's first colours on Parliament Hill in 1973.

=== Charles, Prince of Wales ===
Charles, Prince of Wales (later Charles III) made 12 official tours of Canada from 1970 to 2000. His first official tour of Canada was in July 1970, touring Ottawa, prior to joining the Queen, the Duke of Edinburgh, and Princess Anne's official tour of Manitoba, to celebrate the centennial of Manitoba's entry into Confederation.

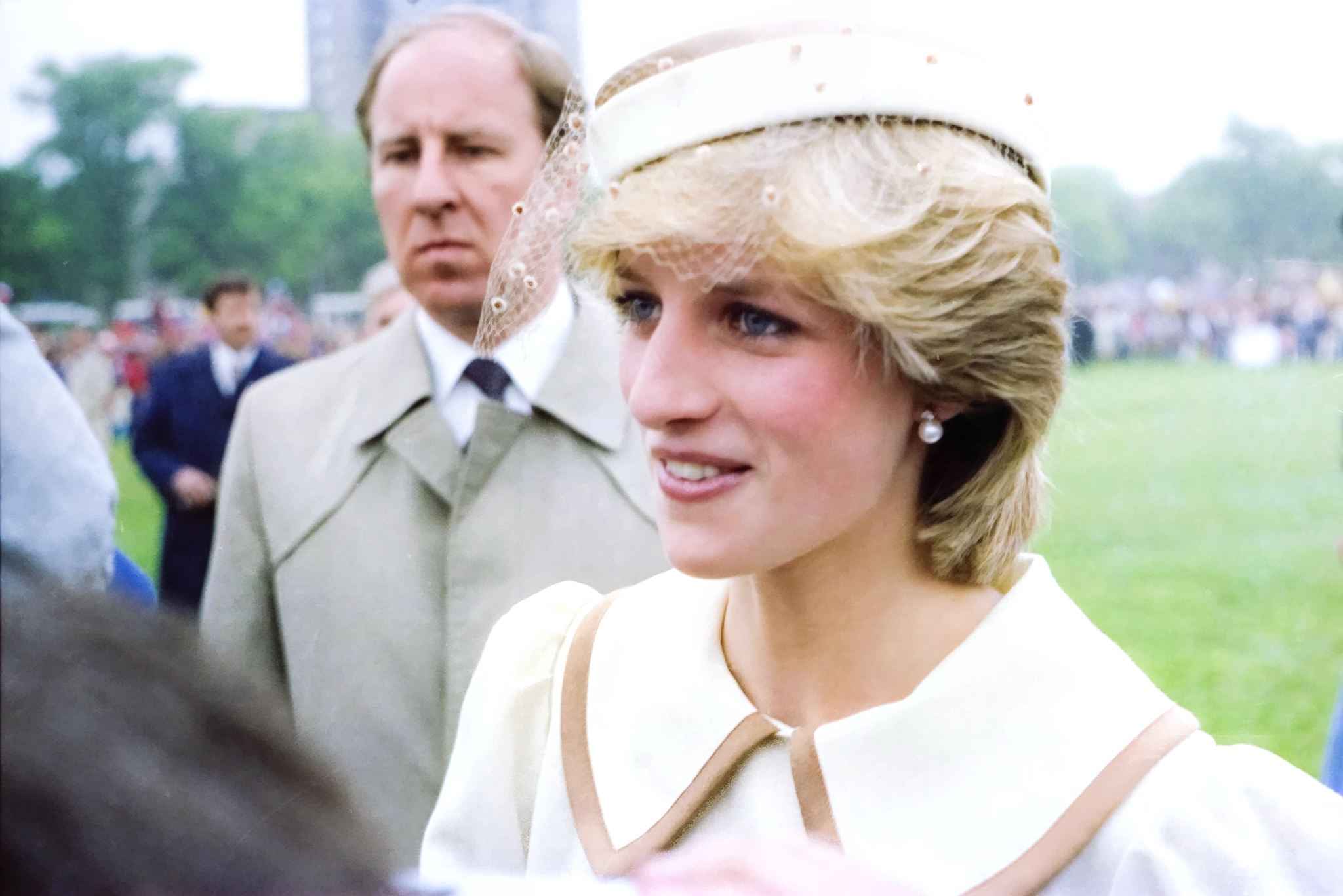
Diana, Princess of Wales, visiting Halifax in March 1983

The Prince and his first wife, the Princess of Wales, attended the bicentennial in 1983 of the arrival of the first Empire Loyalists in Nova Scotia, and also visited Newfoundland to mark the 400th anniversary of the island becoming an English colony. In 1986, the prince and princess of Wales toured British Columbia, visiting Vancouver to open Expo 86 (on 2 May 1986), as well as Victoria, Prince George, Kamloops and Nanaimo.

In 1991, the Prince and Princess of Wales toured Ontario; in Toronto, they returned to the Royal Yacht Britannia where their two sons, Princes William and Harry, awaited them. Diana caused some media controversy when she broke from established protocol by enthusiastically hugging the two boys after she ran up the gangplank to meet them. After performing official duties in the city, including a formal dinner at the Royal York hotel, the royal family then went on to visit Sudbury, Kingston, Ottawa, and Niagara Falls, where the princes, as their great-great-great-grandfather had done, rode on Maid of the Mist.

=== Other royal family members ===
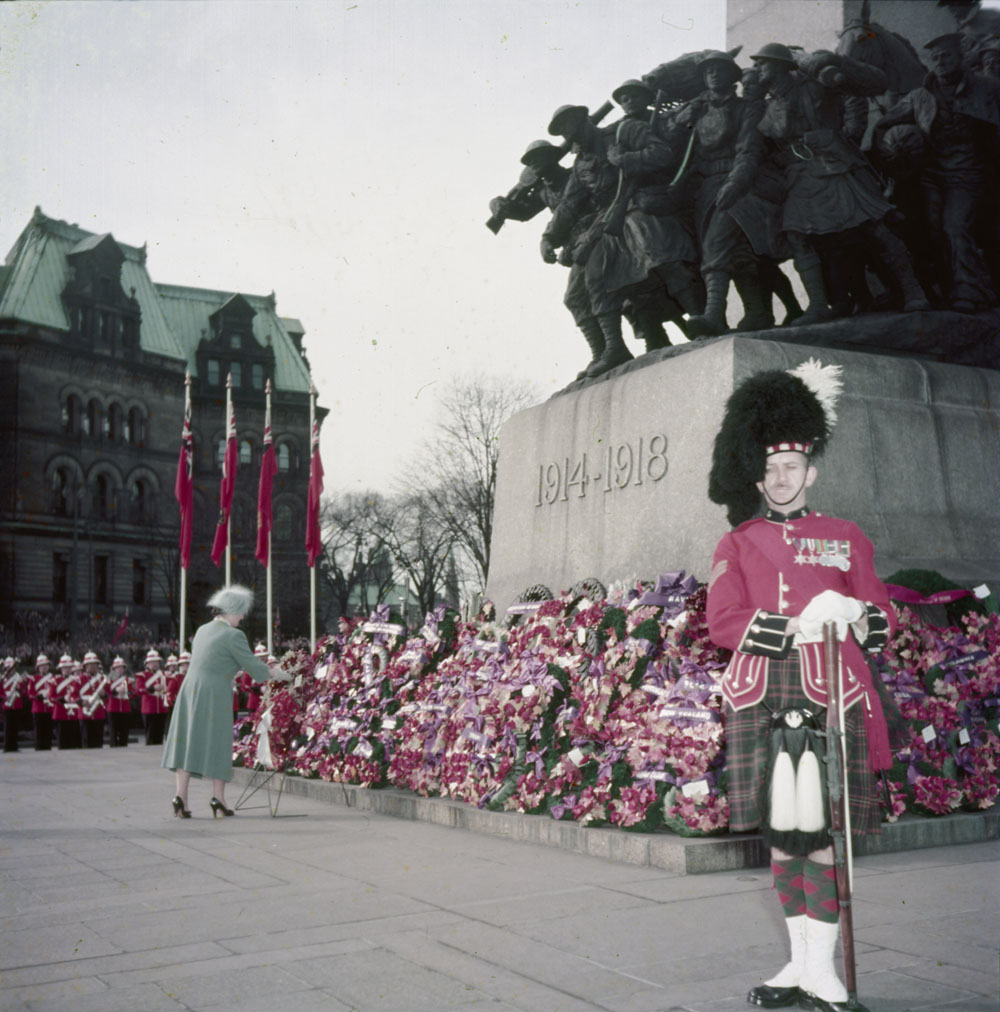
Queen Elizabeth the Queen Mother lays a wreath at the Canadian National War Memorial in 1954.

Queen Elizabeth the Queen Mother, queen consort to King George VI and mother of Elizabeth II, conducted nine official tours of Canada from 1951 to 2000. In 1967, she returned to Nova Scotia and Prince Edward Island to celebrate Canada's centennial in 1967. On a visit in 1985 to Toronto and Saskatchewan she noted, "It is now some 46 years since I first came to this country with the King, in those anxious days shortly before the outbreak of the Second World War. I shall always look back upon that visit with feelings of affection and happiness. I think I lost my heart to Canada and Canadians, and my feelings have not changed with the passage of time." In addition to her nine official tours, she conducted one private working tour in 1965, touring Toronto to celebrate the 50th anniversary of the Toronto Scottish Regiment, a regiment where she held the position of colonel-in-chief.

Elizabeth II's sister, Princess Margaret, Countess of Snowdon, conducted seven official tours of Canada, as well as three private working tours of Canada from 1951 to 2000. Two of her private working tours were conducted in relation to her role as patron of the Princess Margaret Hospital. Official tours included tours of Nova Scotia and British Columbia in 1958. In BC, the princess opened the new floating bridge in Kelowna, with two plaques marking the ceremony. She also presided over the celebrations of the 75th anniversary of Saskatchewan's entry into Confederation.

Princess Alexandra, The Honourable Lady Ogilvy, conducted three official tours of Canada, as well as four private working tours of the country from 1951 to 2000. She toured Canada for its centenary in 1967, and also arrived in Halifax in 1973 to mark the bicentennial of the arrival of the Hector, the first ship to land at Nova Scotia with Scottish colonists.

Anne, Princess Royal, conducted over six official tours of Canada, as well as seven private working tours from 1951 to 2000. Princess Anne presided over the 1970 celebrations of the centennial of Manitoba's entry into Confederation alongside her brother, the Prince of Wales.

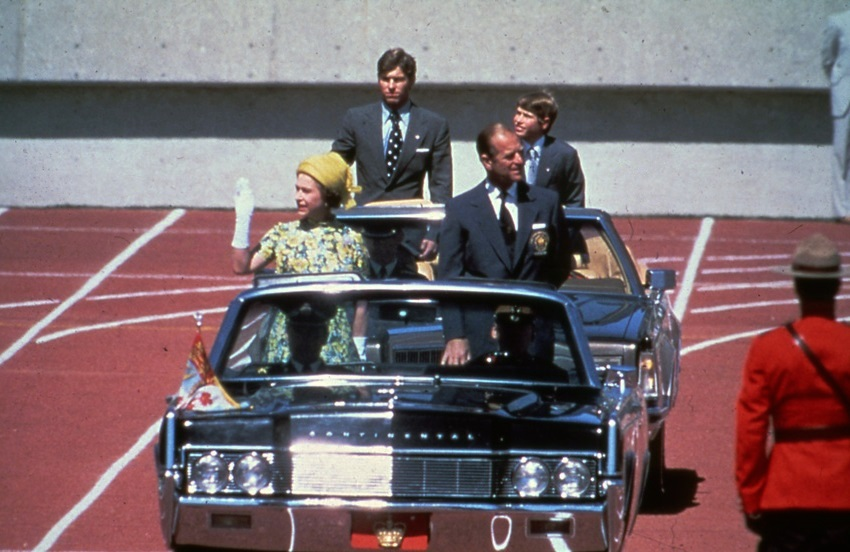
Four members of the royal family—The queen; Prince Philip; Prince Andrew; and Prince Edward—at the opening of the 1978 Commonwealth Games in Edmonton, Alberta.

Prince Andrew, Duke of York, conducted five official tours of Canada, as well as 10 private working tours from 1951 to 2000. His first official tour was conducted in 1976, whereas his first private working tour was conducted in the following year, after attending a semester of secondary school at Lakefield College School, in Selwyn, Ontario. He undertook his first official tour of Nova Scotia in 1985, during which, amongst other activities, he visited Halifax and skippered Bluenose II.

Other members of the royal family that conducted either official, or private working tours of Canada in the second half of the 20th century include Princess Marina, Duchess of Kent, Princess Alice, Duchess of Gloucester, Mary, Princess Royal, Prince Edward, Duke of Kent, Katharine, Duchess of Kent, Prince and Princess Michael of Kent, and the Earl and Countess of Wessex.

== 21st century ==
=== Elizabeth II ===
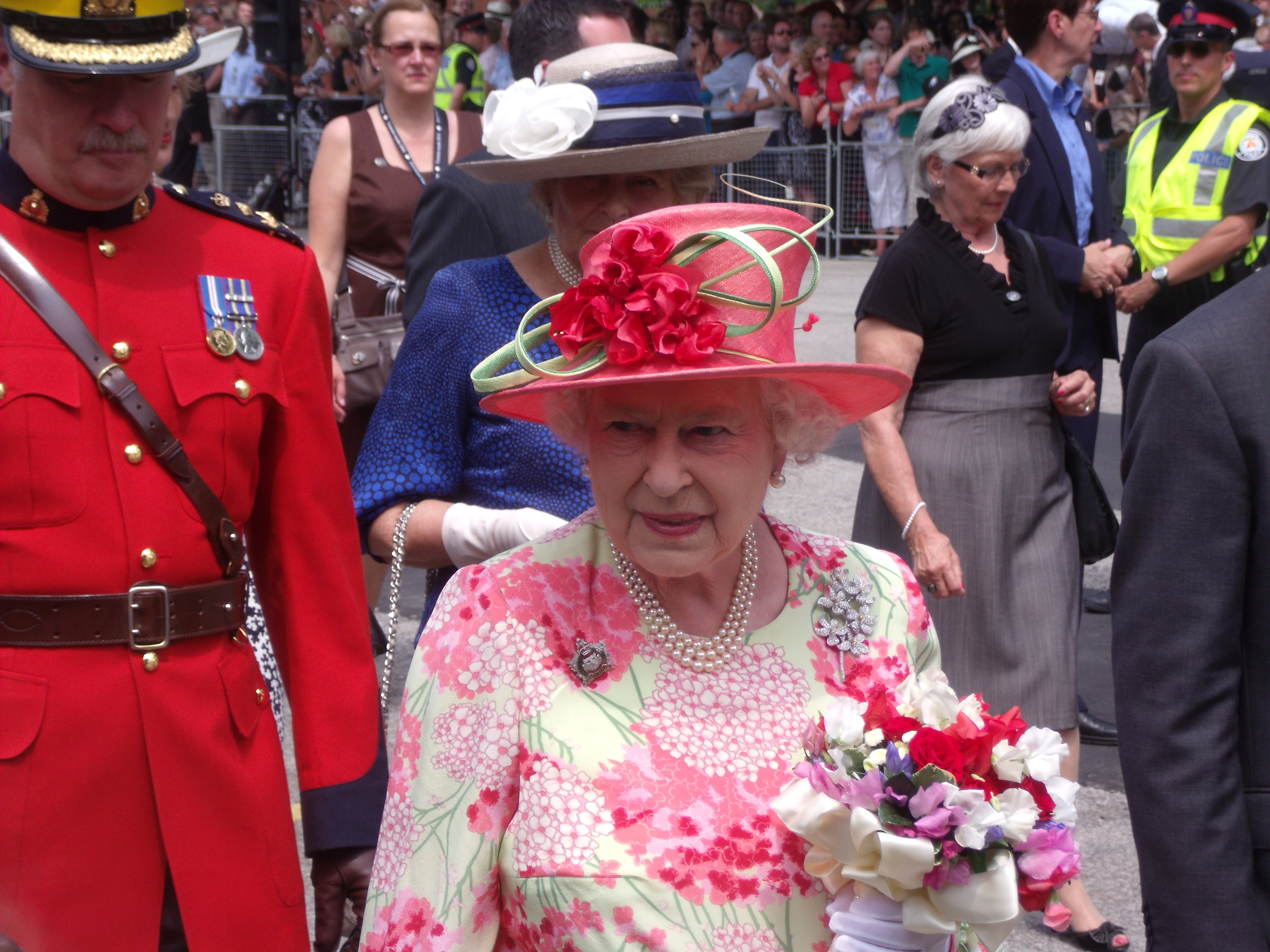
The queen in Queen's Park, Toronto, during her 2010 royal tour.

Elizabeth II conducted three official tours of Canada in the 21st century. In 2002, Elizabeth II toured the Canadian provinces of British Columbia, New Brunswick, Manitoba, Ontario, Quebec, and the territory of Nunavut, for her Golden Jubilee.

In 2005, the Queen was in Alberta again to mark the province's 100th birthday, where she attended, along with an audience of 25,000, a kick-off concert at Commonwealth Stadium, re-designated the Provincial Museum of Alberta as the Royal Alberta Museum, and addressed the Legislative Assembly, becoming the first reigning monarch to do so. The Alberta Ministry of Learning encouraged teachers to focus education on the monarchy and to organize field trips for their students to see the Queen and her consort, or to watch the events on television. In Saskatchewan, the queen presided over the main events for the centennial of Saskatchewan's creation, as well as touring the Canadian Light Source Synchrotron and the University of Saskatchewan, where, in the Diefenbaker Canada Centre, is stored correspondence between former prime minister John Diefenbaker and the Queen.

In 2010, Elizabeth II visited Ontario and Manitoba. Arriving in Ottawa 30 June, she toured the Canadian Museum of Nature and met with Prime Minister Stephen Harper. The following day, the Queen and the Duke of Edinburgh joined the festivities for Canada Day on Parliament Hill. The royal tour ended as the Queen and the Duke of Edinburgh departed for New York on 6 July, following visits to Toronto and Waterloo.

=== Charles III ===
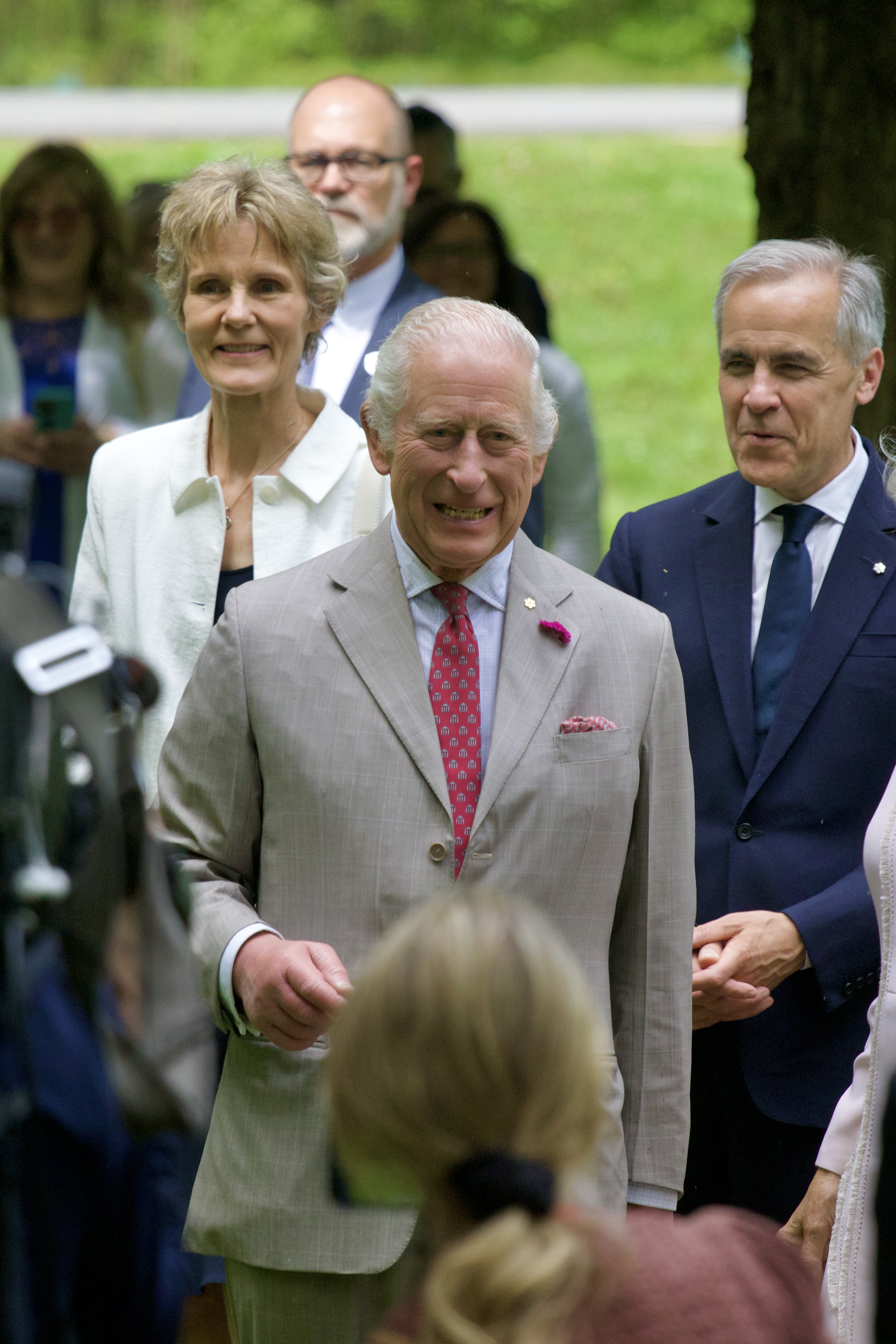
King Charles III during the 2025 royal tour of Canada.

Since 2001, Charles, Prince of Wales (later King Charles III), conducted six official tours in Canada as the prince of Wales: in April 2001, November 2009, May 2012, May 2014, June–July 2017, and May 2022. He was accompanied by his spouse, Camilla, Duchess of Cornwall (later Queen Camilla) on the latter five tours.

In 2001 he toured through Ottawa, where his interactions with the crowds kept Prime Minister Jean Chrétien waiting for twenty minutes. He also toured Regina, Moose Jaw, Assiniboia, Saskatoon, Whitehorse, and Mayo. In Saskatchewan, he turned the sod for the Prince of Wales Cultural and Recreation Centre in Assiniboia and dedicated the Anniversary Arch outside Regina's YMCA. Charles and Camilla visited New Brunswick, Ontario, and Saskatchewan from 20–23 May 2012 during the year of the queen's Diamond Jubilee. In 2017, the Prince of Wales and Duchess of Cornwall were in Canada from 29 June to 1 July for Canada Day celebration and for the country's sesquicentennial celebrations. Charles and Camilla again visited Canada in May 2022, during the year of the Queen's Platinum Jubilee. A theme of their 3-day visit was reconciliation with the indigenous peoples in Canada, which Charles framed as a "vital process".

In May 2025, King Charles III made his first official visit to Canada as monarch. Accompanied by Queen Camilla, he arrived in Ottawa on May 26 and presided over the Opening of the 45th Canadian Parliament on May 27. It was the first time since 1977 that a reigning monarch personally delivered the speech from the throne in Canada.

=== William, Prince of Wales ===
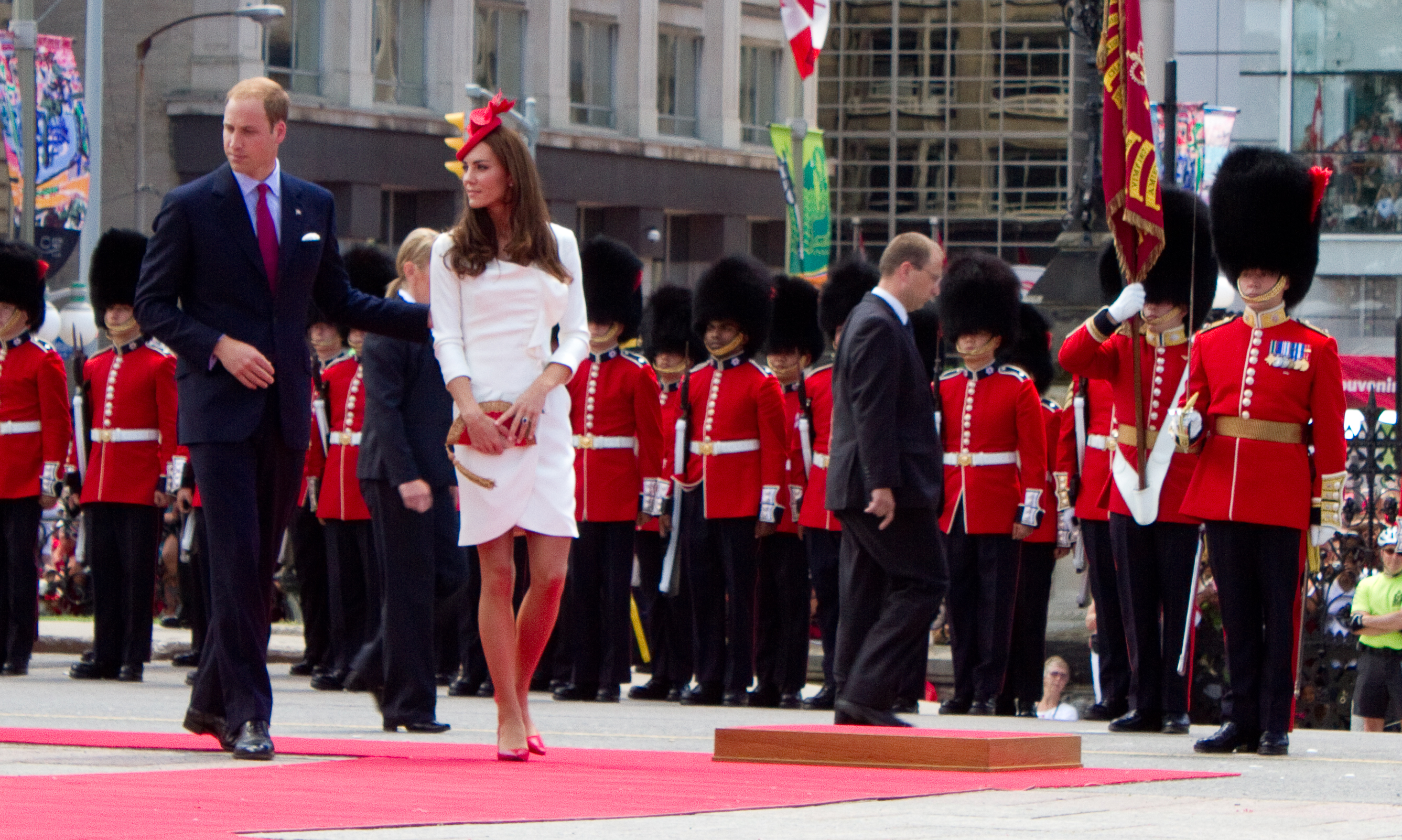
Prince William and the Duchess of Cambridge at an inspection of the Governor General's Foot Guards during their 2011 royal tour of Canada.

William, Prince of Wales (known as Duke of Cambridge 2011–2022) has conducted two official tours in Canada in the 21st century. The 2011 royal tour of Canada was the first time Prince William and Catherine visited Canada as the Duke and Duchess of Cambridge. The tour saw the newlywed couple tour Ottawa, Montreal, Quebec City, Charlottetown, Summerside, Yellowknife, Calgary, as well as the fire-ravaged community of Slave Lake. It was the first such tour undertaken by the duke and Duchess since their marriage two months prior.

In 2016, the Duke and Duchess of Cambridge, along with their children, Prince George of Cambridge and Princess Charlotte of Cambridge, conducted an official tour of British Columbia and Yukon, visiting Victoria, Vancouver, Bella Bella, Kelowna, Whitehorse, Carcross, and Haida Gwaii.

=== Anne, Princess Royal ===
Anne, Princess Royal has conducted seven private working tours, and one official working tour of Canada since 2001. She conducted private working tours in August–September 2003, June 2004, June 2007, February 2010, April 2010, October 2013, and February 2015; and one official tour in November 2014.

The Princess Royal's private tours to Canada are typically conducted in association with her honorary role as the colonel in chief of six units in the Canadian Forces. In April 2010, she visited St. John's to celebrate the anniversary of the Royal Newfoundland Regiment, as well as Regina, to celebrate its centennial. The Princess Royal also made a visit to Barrie on 22 October 2013 to commemorate the opening of park with military significance and to visit the Grey and Simcoe Foresters, for which she their current colonel-in-chief.

The Princess Royal and her husband Vice-Admiral Tim Laurence arrived in Canada on 10 November 2014 in Ottawa for a two-day official tour, with focus on Remembrance Day ceremonies in Ottawa, such as the re-dedication of the National War Memorial.

=== Prince Edward, Duke of Edinburgh ===
Prince Edward, Earl of Wessex, with members of the Monarchist League of Canada in Toronto, 2005.

Since 2001, Prince Edward, Duke of Edinburgh (known as Earl of Wessex 1999–2023), has conducted 17 private working tours in Canada. His first visit to Canada in the 21st century occurred in October 2001, with his latest tour occurring in October–November 2015. Most of these visits were conducted for ceremonies relating to the Duke of Edinburgh Award.

In 2003, Prince Edward opened two parks in Saskatchewan, the Prince Edward Park in Melfort and the queen's Golden Jubilee Rose Garden in Moose Jaw. In 2005, the Earl and Countess of Wessex toured Ontario; the Earl visited Peterborough, Prince Edward County, and Toronto, while his spouse, Sophie, Countess of Wessex, went to Welland to be installed as Colonel-in-Chief of the Lincoln and Welland Regiment.

The Countess has accompanied her husband on a number of tours to Canada. Their tour of Canada in 2002 marked the Countess's first tour outside of the United Kingdom. In 2009, the Countess of Wessex opened the Air Force Museum of Alberta in Calgary, spending some hours visiting its displays. The Countess of Wessex has also conducted private working tours of her own, as was the case in November 2015.

Prince Edward, Duke of Edinburgh, visited Canada from 25 June to 2 July 2025, focusing on Prince Edward Island, Toronto, and Ottawa. His visit included celebrating the 150th anniversary of the Prince Edward Island Regiment, participating in Canada Day celebrations in Ottawa, and engaging with youth through the Duke of Edinburgh's International Award.

=== Other royal family members ===
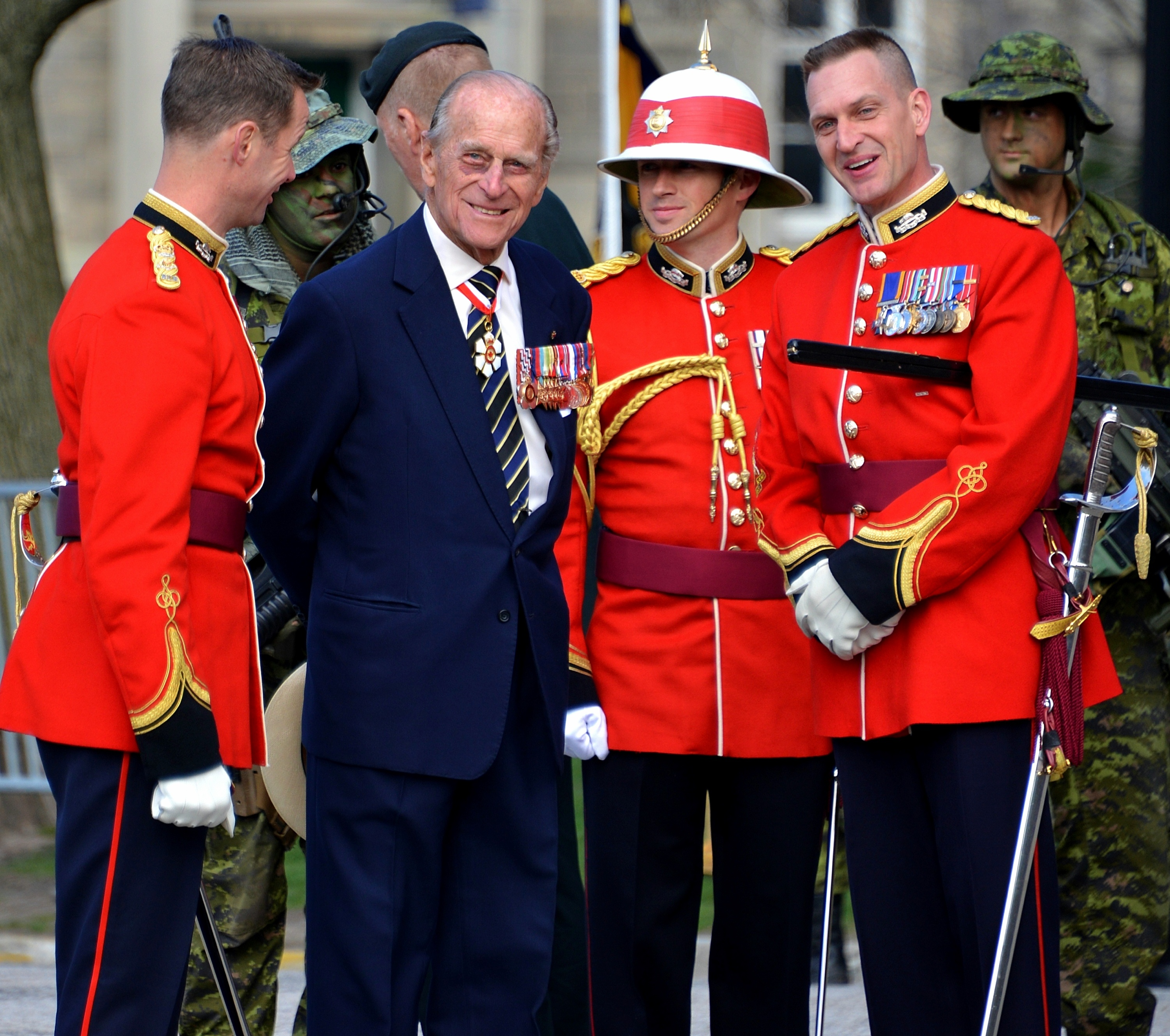
Prince Philip with members of The Royal Canadian Regiment in 2013

In the 21st century, Prince Philip conducted three official tours alongside Queen Elizabeth, in October 2002, May 2005, and June 2010. In addition to official tours, he conducted three private working tours, in October 2001, April 2004, and April 2013. In 2001, he visited Toronto in order to present the Duke of Edinburgh Award to recipients, and to participate in activities relating to the World Wildlife Foundation. In April 2013, David Johnston, the governor general of Canada, presented Philip with the Order of Military Merit, and inducted him as a Companion of the Order of Canada. On 27 April 2013, Prince Philip, the Colonel-in-Chief of the Royal Canadian Regiment, visited Toronto to present the 3rd Battalion its second stand of colours.

Prince Andrew, Duke of York, conducted 17 private working tours in Canada since 2001. His first tour in the 21st century was in January 2001, and his last tour in Canada was in May 2019. In 2003, he came twice, at one point going into the field in Canadian combat uniform to observe tactical exercises and to address the troopers of the Queen's York Rangers, of which he was colonel-in-chief.

Princess Alexandra, the Honourable Lady Ogilvy, has conducted two private working tours of Canada, in April 2010, and October 2012. In 2010, she visited Toronto and Victoria to attend the 150th anniversary ceremonies for the establishment of the Queen's Own Rifles of Canada, of which she was the colonel-in-chief from 1960 to 2010. In 2012, she returned to Victoria to attend the 100th anniversary of the Canadian Scottish Regiment (Princess Mary's).

Since 2001, Prince Harry, Duke of Sussex, has visited Canada on two private working tours, on 26 June 2007, and from September to October 2008. Both visits were conducted for military exercises at CFB Suffield in Alberta. In addition to private working tours, Harry has made informal visits to the country, such as the opening of the 2017 Invictus Games in Toronto. It was during these games that Prince Harry, and his future spouse, Meghan Markle, made their first public appearance together. Prior to their first public appearance, reports had surfaced in 2016 that Harry visited Meghan at her home in Toronto; she resided in the city from 2011 to 2017 to film the television series Suits.

== See also ==
- List of royal tours of Canada (18th–20th centuries)
- List of royal tours of Canada (21st century)
- List of royal visits to Hamilton, Ontario
- List of royal visits to London, Ontario
- Royal visits to Saskatchewan
- Royal and viceroyal transport in Canada
  - Royal Canadian Air Force VIP aircraft

== Sources ==
- Bousfield, Arthur; Toffoli, Garry (1989). Royal Spring: The Royal Tour of 1939 and the Queen Mother in Canada. Toronto: Dundurn Press. ISBN 1-55002-065-X.
- Bousfield, Arthur; Toffoli, Garry (2002). Fifty Years the Queen: A Tribute to Her Majesty Queen Elizabeth II on Her Golden Jubilee. Dundurn Press. ISBN 978-1-5500-2360-2.
- Bousfield, Arthur; Toffoli, Garry (2010). Royal Tours 1786-2010: Home to Canada. Dundurn Press. ISBN 978-1-4597-1165-5.
- Buckner, Phillip (2005). "The Last Great Royal Tour: Queen Elizabeth's 1959 Tour to Canada". In Buckner, Phillip (ed.). Canada and the End of Empire. Vancouver: UBC Press. ISBN 978-0-7748-0915-3.
- Hubbard, R.H. (1977). Rideau Hall. Montreal and London: McGill-Queen's University Press. ISBN 978-0-7735-0310-6. p. 8–9
- Tidridge, Nathan (2013). Prince Edward, Duke of Kent: Father of the Canadian Crown. Dundurn Press. ISBN 978-1-4597-0790-0.
