= List of royal visits to London, Ontario =

London, a Canadian city located in Southwestern Ontario along the Quebec City–Windsor Corridor, has received numerous royal visits since 1939. The late Canadian monarch, Queen Elizabeth II, first visited in 1973, and subsequent visits have been made by other members of the Canadian Royal Family since then.

Prince Philip visit to London Ontario for Presentation of New Queen's Colours to the First and Third Battalion The Royal Canadian Regiment London Ontario 23 October 1969 Worsley Barracks.

== List of royal visits by date ==
Year	Person or people	Notes	Refs
1939	King George VI; Queen Elizabeth	Royal Visit by King George VI and Queen Elizabeth	
1962	Prince Philip	Second Commonwealth Study Conference	
1973	Queen Elizabeth II	Participate in events marking the R.C.M.P. centennial	
1980	Prince Philip	Fifth Commonwealth Study Conference	
1983	Prince Philip	Participate in events marking the centennial of the Royal Canadian Regiment, including a trooping of the colours at J.W. Little Stadium, 1983-07-01	
1989	Queen Elizabeth The Queen Mother	Opening of Western Counties Wing, Parkwood Hospital, and unveiling of statue of Dr. Banting	
1997	Queen Elizabeth II; Prince Philip	Marked the 500th anniversary of John Cabot's arrival in what is now Canada	
