= 2025 royal visit to Canada =

Visit to Canada by King Charles III

- King Charles III delivering the 2025 Speech from the Throne in the Senate of Canada Building
- Date: May 26, 2025–May 27, 2025
- Venue: Ottawa, Ontario
- Location: Canada
- Type: Royal visit
- Organized by: Government of Canada
- Participants: King Charles III; Queen Camilla

A royal visit to Canada took place on May 26 and 27, 2025, the first to the country by Charles III as King of Canada. Accompanied by Queen Camilla, the King opened the 45th Canadian Parliament and delivered the Speech from the Throne, his first as King of Canada, and the first for any Canadian monarch since 1977.

The visit was intended as an affirmation of the country's sovereignty in the face of the United States trade war with Canada and threats by US President Donald Trump to annex Canada.

It was the twentieth official visit by Charles to Canada, and his first since becoming King in 2022.

== Background ==
The presence of Their Majesties at this pivotal moment in our history holds profound significance. It reaffirms the enduring constitutional bond that has shaped Canada’s journey into a proud and independent nation. Their visit invites us to reflect on who we are and to celebrate our distinct national identity.

— Mary Simon, Governor General of Canada

Shortly after his victory in the 2024 United States presidential election, Donald Trump began musing about annexing Canada, calling it the "51st state" and referring to then Prime Minister Justin Trudeau as "Governor of Canada". He also spoke about using "economic force" to compel Canada to join the US, and soon after imposed punishing tariffs on Canadian exports, under the guise of national security. This led to an increase in Canadian patriotism, and calls for the King to express support for Canada due to Trump's admiration for the British monarchy. The King was subsequently seen to be more active in Canadian affairs, meeting two prime ministers in short order, publicly presenting a sword to the Usher of the Black Rod, and wearing more red than usual.

== Visit ==
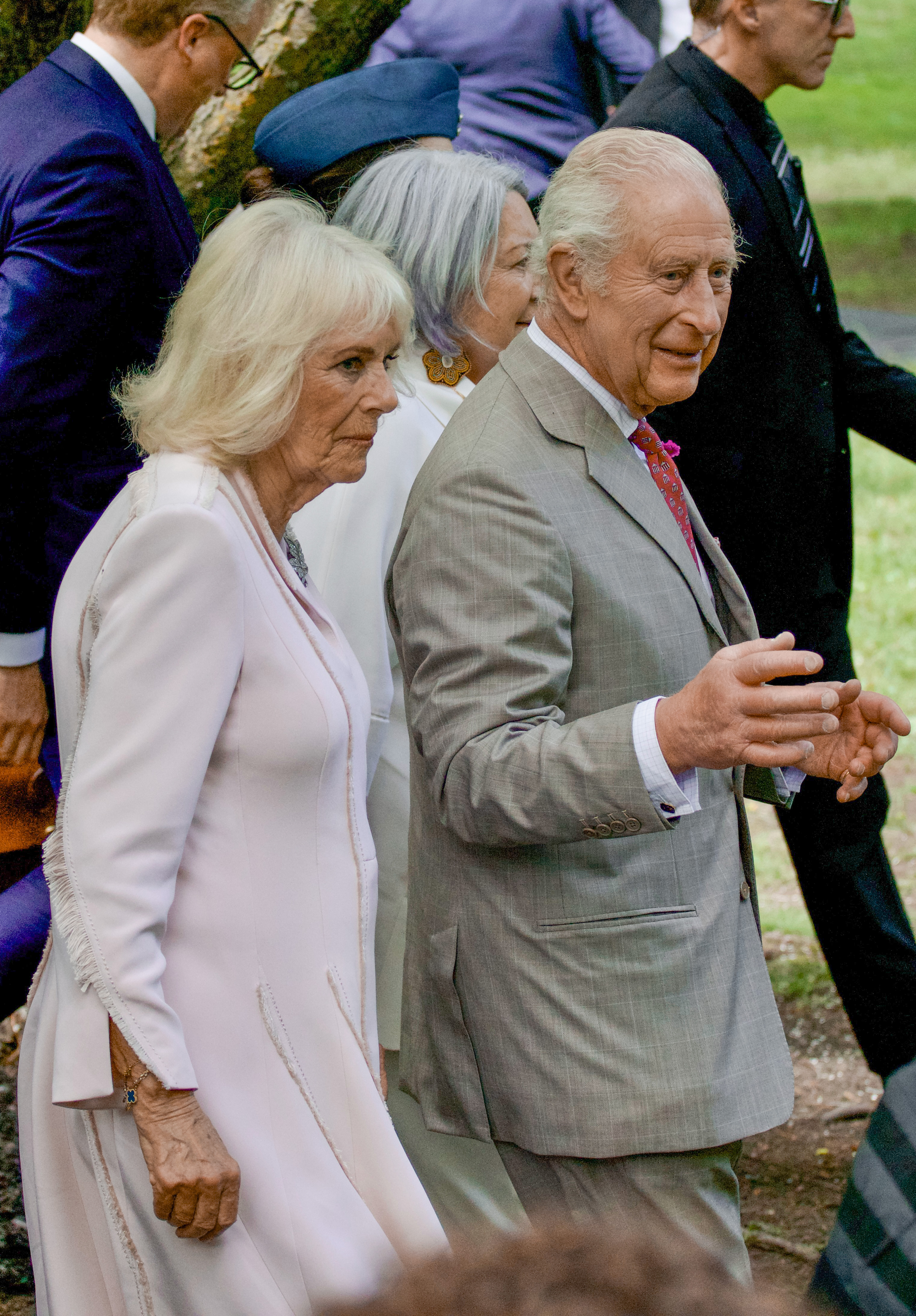
King Charles III and Queen Camilla after the ceremonial planting of a blue beech tree at Rideau Hall

=== May 26 ===
In the morning, the King and Queen departed RAF Brize Norton, Oxfordshire, aboard a CC-330 Husky aircraft of the Royal Canadian Air Force with the callsign 'ROYL 01'. The Governor General of Canada, Mary Simon, issued a statement welcoming them, which ended with "Welcome home, Your Majesties." The King and Queen landed at Macdonald-Cartier International Airport, Ottawa where they were greeted by a guard of honour of Royal Canadian Dragoons as well members of the Royal Canadian Mounted Police and Canada Border Services Agency in ceremonial dress; the governor general; Prime Minister Mark Carney; Lieutenant Governor of Ontario, Edith Dumont; and Indigenous leaders. The King and Queen travelled by motorcade to Lansdowne Park and toured a nearby farmers' market, before taking part in the ceremonial puck drop at a youth hockey game.

Charles and Camilla then travelled to Rideau Hall, where the King planted a blue beech tree. They greeted representatives from the King's Trust Canada, a charitable organization founded by the King, while the watching crowd sang "God Save the King" and "O Canada". The King then greeted the ten provincial lieutenant governors. At Rideau Hall, the King held audiences with the Governor General, the Prime Minister and Indigenous leaders. Later, the Queen was sworn into the Privy Council for Canada.

=== May 27 ===
The King and Queen departed Rideau Hall in the morning, travelling in the State Landau of Canada, and escorted by the RCMP on horseback. Upon arriving at the Senate of Canada Building, the temporary home of the Senate of Canada, the King was greeted by a guard of honour of the Royal Canadian Regiment and received full military honours, including a 21-gun salute and the playing of the royal anthem and national anthem. Whilst inspecting the honour guard, cheers of "God Save the King" were heard from the crowd. Accompanied by the Governor General and Prime Minister, the King and Queen watched a First Nations drum performance after entering the Senate building.

The King delivering the speech from the throne sitting on the Throne of Canada in the senate chamber

They then processed into the senate chamber, and took their seats on the sesquicentennial thrones. Officially starting the new session of the Canadian Parliament, the King began his speech with an Indigenous land acknowledgement, referencing the Algonquin Anishinaabeg people, and delivered parts of the speech in French. He received an unusual standing ovation from the chamber after stating "The True North is indeed strong and free." This broke with tradition, as protocol dictates that members of parliament should refrain from reacting during addresses by the monarch or the Governor General.

I wish to express to you and to the people of Canada, my heartfelt gratitude, and that of my wife, for the warmth of the welcome which we have received.
As the anthem reminds us, The True North is indeed strong and free!

— Charles III, King of Canada,
Speech from the Throne

Charles and Camilla, accompanied by Prime Minister Carney, greeted crowds outside the senate building.

The King and Queen then moved to the National War Memorial and paid their respects at the Tomb of the Unknown Soldier, laying a wreath and greeting veterans of the Canadian Armed Forces. The ceremony ended with the King and Queen receiving a final farewell royal salute of "O Canada" from the Royal Canadian Air Force Band and a flyover by RCAF fighter jets. The King and Queen then said goodbye to officials gathered, and waved to the crowds before departing for the airport. The King thanked the police, military and civil authorities who had helped the trip, before boarding 'ROYL01' and departing Canada.

To mark the visit, the Government of Canada donated $50,000 to the King's Trust on behalf of all Canadians, reflecting its commitment to youth and inclusion.

The government's invitation to the King to read the speech was criticized by the Bloc Québécois, which referred to him as a "foreign monarch" and called the move "disrespectful" of the Québécois people. The Bloc protested by boycotting the throne speech and announcing that they will table a private member's bill to end the requirement for MPs to pledge loyalty to the monarch.

== Commentary ==
Craig Prescott, a constitutional expert and lecturer in law at Royal Holloway, University of London, called the visit a historic moment for Canada and King Charles. He also said that Charles showed himself to be a modern monarch and his throne speech was "an example of him delivering a sharper speech than Elizabeth II would."

Andrew Cohen, author of The Unfinished Canadian: The People We Are criticized the invitation to Charles in the Globe and Mail, saying that while it was done to make a point, "there is much more to do than score symbolic points to make Canada truly sovereign" including diversifying trade and strengthening the military but also declaring constitutional independence from the United Kingdom by detaching Canada from the monarchy. He also criticized Charles for not having said something "definitive" earlier in the year in response to Trump's rhetoric.

Historian Philip Murphy of the University of London told The Sunday Times that "The Canadians' game plan will be to have their constitutional cake and eat it by exploiting the ambiguities of the constitutional position of monarch. They'll be keen to stress that Charles is not just King of Canada but King of the United Kingdom, and seen throughout the world as such, so by having him there they can stress that the U.K. is on Canada's side in any trade confrontation with the U.S.," amid reports that the British government was uncomfortable with the Canadian government's utilization of Charles in its conflict with the United States.

Former British cabinet minister Jacob Rees-Mogg observed that "for the first time since 1603, with the King as King of Canada, we are seeing two of his governments taking a different strategy that is dependent on the person of the King" with Keir Starmer's government advising Charles to be very friendly with Donald Trump, in the interests of UK-US relations and Mark Carney's government using the King to emphasize Canadian independence.

Vinay Menon, wrote in the Toronto Star that the King's throne speech was his way of playing Canada's superhero against Donald Trump, showing that Canada "is not alone".

Andrew Coyne, a columnist for the Globe and Mail, wrote that the symbolism of the King's speech in parliament is that the crown is the "foundation of our legal system and government".

Afua Hagan, a commentator on royalty for CTV News, wrote that the King and Queen's visit was probably "one of the most consequential royal visits in recent memory". The visit also revealed "the monarchy's enduring role in Canada—not only as a symbolic institution, but as a subtle practitioner of soft power on the global stage".

Martin Kettle, a British columnist for The Guardian, described the occasion as an "audaciously disjunctive event" due to Canada being "a major global power [that] has decisively slipped its old colonial bonds", yet finding it necessary to "summon an elderly hereditary monarch from across the ocean" as a riposte to President Trump's threats, a role Charles could have declined but instead willingly assumed. He also observed that the Canadian throne speech "had a far looser and more personal format than the Westminster version [allowing] the king to speak words that clearly mattered to him, and by which he will be judged" and that this allowed Charles to "push the boundaries" of neutrality expected of the monarch in his role as King of the United Kingdom, and that his mother observed as Queen.

Jen Gerson, a Canadian commentator, noted in The Guardian that King Charles is a symbol of Canadian history and system of government, distinct from "the flailing republicanism of the US".
