= 2025 Speech from the Throne =

Start of session of the 45th Canadian Parliament

- King Charles III and Queen Camilla in the Senate of Canada
- Legislative body: Parliament of Canada
- Meeting place: Senate Chamber
- Date: 27 May 2025
- Government: 30th Canadian Ministry

The Speech from the Throne of the Parliament of Canada took place on May 27, 2025, when Charles III, King of Canada, opened the new session of the 45th Canadian Parliament, which was the first after the 2025 federal election. Charles delivered the Throne Speech, his first as King of Canada, and the first for any Canadian monarch since 1977. He set out the Canadian government's legislative priorities for the following parliamentary session.

Along with Camilla, Queen of Canada, Charles travelled to the Senate through Wellington Street in Canada's state landau. They were accompanied by the Royal Canadian Mounted Police (RCMP). At the Senate of Canada Building, the King read the speech from the throne in the temporary Senate chamber. The addresses to be directed to the King to thank him for the speech were then debated by Parliament. It marked Mark Carney's first speech from the throne since becoming Prime Minister of Canada and leading the Liberal Party in the election in the previous month. The title of the throne speech was "Building Canada Strong: A bold, ambitious plan for our future".

== Background ==
Beginning in late 2024, after his election as President of the United States, Donald Trump began musing about annexing Canada, calling it the "51st state" and referring to then Prime Minister Justin Trudeau as "Governor of Canada". He also spoke about using "economic force" to get Canada to join the US, and soon after imposed punishing tariffs on Canadian exports, under the guise of national security. This led to an increase in Canadian patriotism, and also calls for the King to get more involved in diplomatic affairs. The King was seen to subsequently be more active in Canadian affairs. In March 2025, he met with both Justin Trudeau and Mark Carney in their roles as Prime Minister to discuss the importance of Canadian sovereignty and he publicly presented a sword to the Usher of the Black Rod. In addition, King Charles was seen wearing more red than usual.

On May 2, 2025, following the 2025 federal election, it was announced that there would be a speech from the throne on May 27, accompanied by a royal tour. The election, held on April 28, was won by the Liberal Party, with Mark Carney continuing as prime minister; he was elected by his party as leader in March.

This was the third time a monarch has read the throne speech and the second such time a reigning monarch has opened a new parliament. Charles's mother, Elizabeth II, opened the 23rd Parliament and read the speech in 1957, and also read the throne speech to open the 3rd session of the 30th Parliament in 1977. At other times, the throne speech is read by the governor general or occasionally by the administrator of the government, in their capacity as representative of the monarch.

Accompanied by Queen Camilla, Charles became the first monarch to use the new throne in the Senate building.

== Speech ==
The King delivering the speech from the throne sitting on the Throne of Canada in the senate chamber

The King and Queen entered the Senate of Canada, in its temporary home in the Senate of Canada Building, where the King would read the speech from the throne. Members of Parliament (MPs) from the House of Commons were summoned to attend the Senate by J. Greg Peters, who holds the office of Black Rod. As a symbol of the House of Commons' independence from the reigning monarch, the doors to the chamber were closed upon Peters' approach, requiring him to knock three times for it to be opened. Once MPs had assembled in the Senate entrance, Charles then read the King's Speech. The speech, prepared by the government, set out its planned priorities of legislation for the next session of parliament, and was read by the King in a neutral tone so as not to show any appearance of political support. MPs listened to the speech in mostly silence, before returning to the Commons, where a debate on the address in reply to the speech began.

I wish to express to you and to the people of Canada, my heartfelt gratitude, and that of my wife, for the warmth of the welcome which we have received.
As the anthem reminds us, The True North is indeed strong and free!

— Charles III, King of Canada,
Speech from the Throne 2025

The speech began with an Indigenous land acknowledgement. Officially starting the new session of the Canadian Parliament, the King received an unusual standing ovation from the chamber after stating "The True North is indeed strong and free." This broke with tradition, as standard protocol dictates that members of parliament should remain silent and refrain from reacting during addresses by the monarch or the governor general. The speech was mostly centred on economic reforms, housing, and border security. Legislation to remove all internal trade barriers by Canada Day was announced during the speech. The former prime ministers Justin Trudeau, Stephen Harper, and Kim Campbell, as well as the former governors general David Johnston, Michaëlle Jean, and Adrienne Clarkson, were in attendance. The incumbent governor general, Mary Simon, was also present. The 91-year-old former prime minister Jean Chrétien was expected to attend, but was unable to because he was recovering from heart surgery. The King and Queen, accompanied by the prime minister, greeted crowds outside the Senate building. At 2,500 words, it was slightly shorter than the one delivered to Parliament in 2021.

== Response ==
At the conclusion of the Throne Speech in the Senate chamber, the King received a standing ovation — including from the Queen.

Responding to the speech, Pierre Poilievre, the leader of the Conservative Party of Canada, said his party would not oppose the government on every measure, but would hold them to account on their election promises. He described the government's proposed spending as "morbidly obese". The speech was also reacted to by Don Davies of the New Democratic Party, Yves-François Blanchet of the Bloc Québécois, and Elizabeth May of the Green Party. The address in reply (to thank the King for the speech) was adopted by the House of Commons, with the addition of several amendments to the original text of thanks, without a recorded vote on June 4. The NDP caucus voted against the text of the address in reply, while the Liberal, Bloc, and Green caucuses voted in favour. The Conservatives had an unclear position.

The government's invitation to the King to read the Throne Speech was criticized by the Bloc Québécois, which referred to Charles as a "foreign monarch" and called the move "disrespectful" of the Québécois. The Bloc protested against the invitation by boycotting the throne speech and announcing that they would table a private member's bill to end the requirement for MPs to swear allegiance to the monarch.
