= Land acknowledgement =

Formal statement spoken at the beginning of a public event

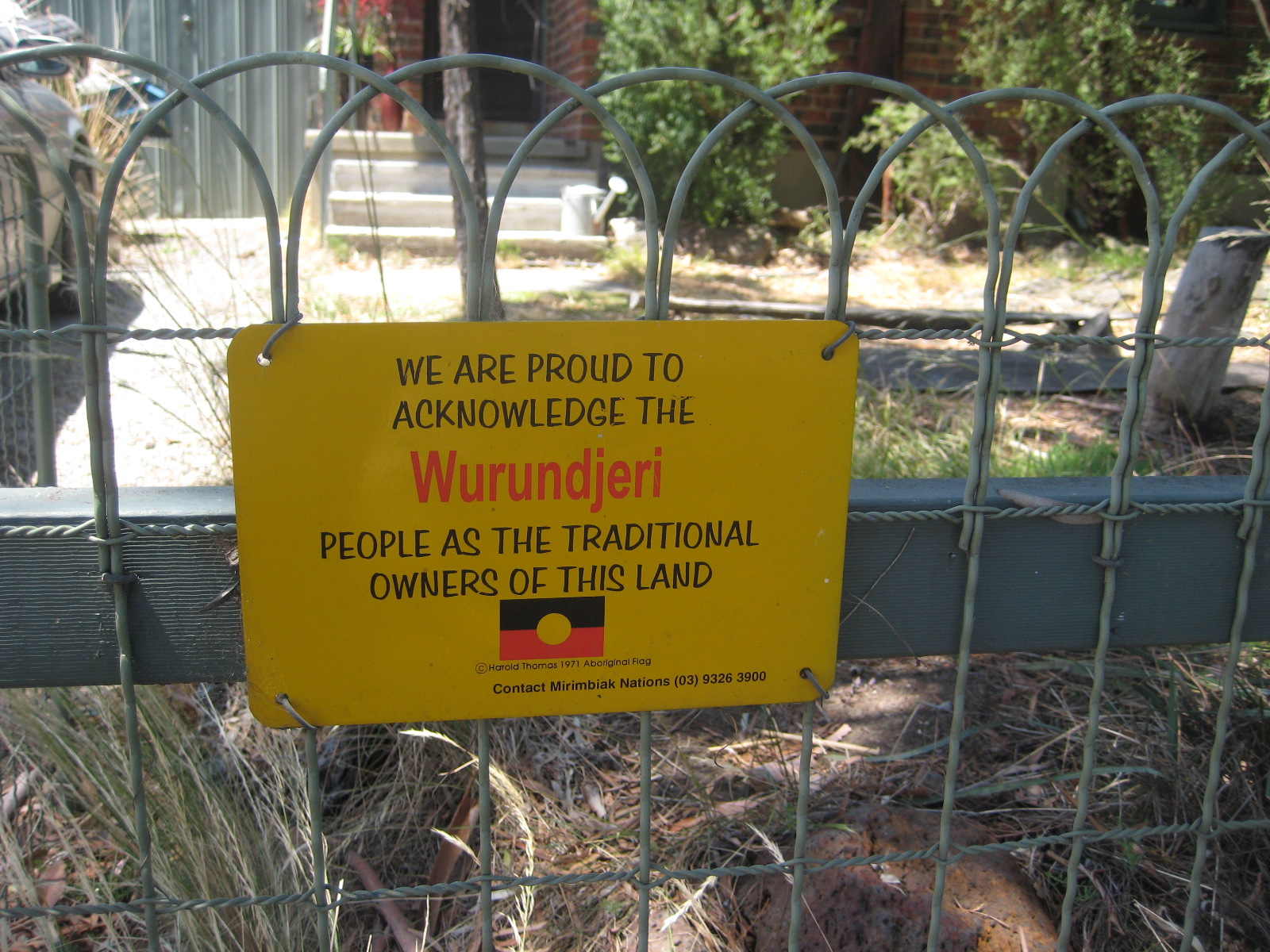
Sign in Coburg, Victoria, acknowledging that the Wurundjeri people originally inhabited the land, and containing the Australian Aboriginal flag

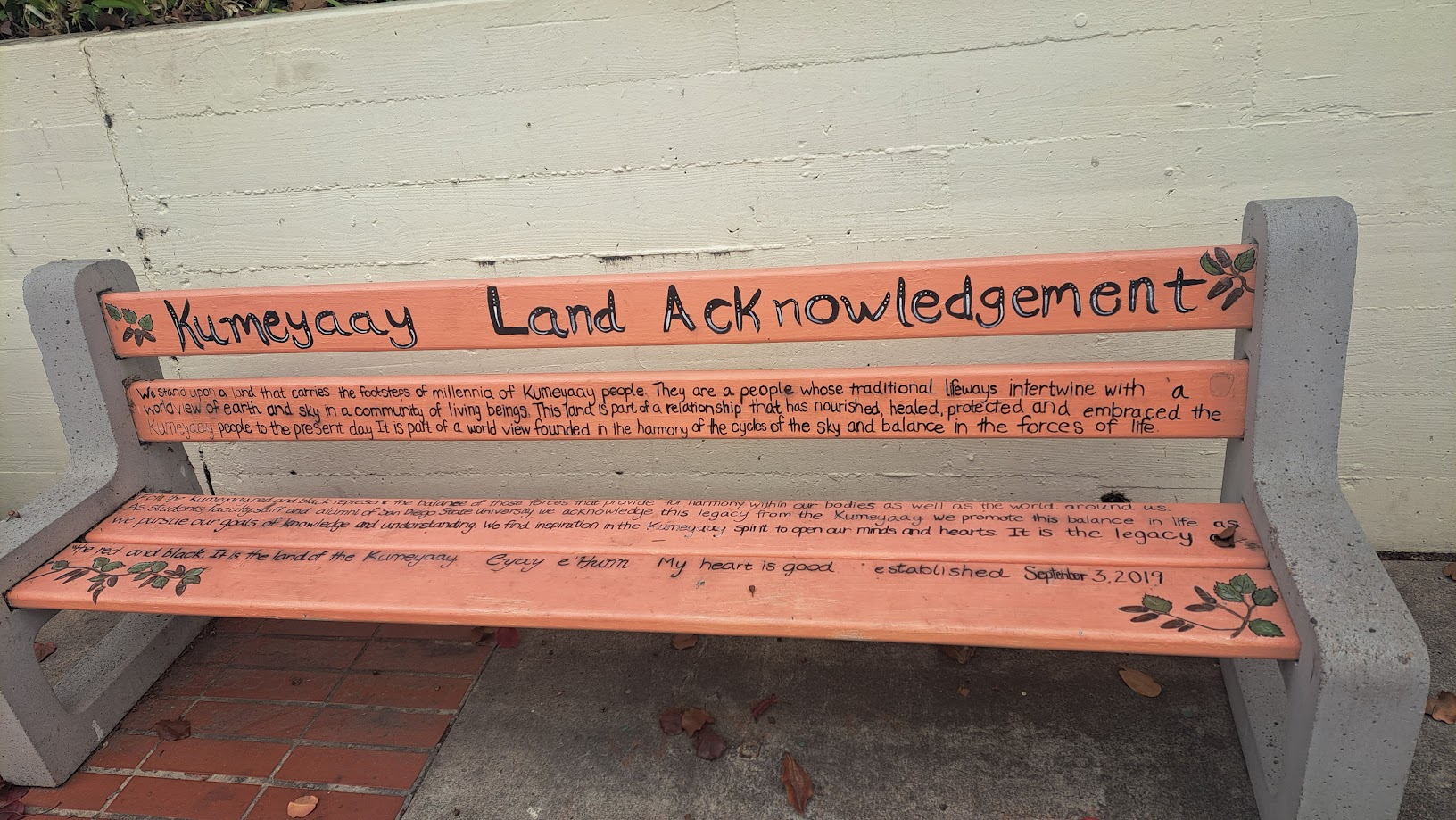
Kumeyaay land acknowledgement art at San Diego State University

A land acknowledgement (or territorial acknowledgement) is a formal statement that acknowledges the indigenous peoples of the land. It may be in written form, or be spoken at the beginning of public events. The custom of land acknowledgement is present in Canada, Australia, and New Zealand, and more recently in the United States.

== History ==
The modern practice of land acknowledgements began in Australia in the late 1970s, taking the form of the Welcome to Country ceremony, and was at first primarily associated with Indigenous Australian political movements and the arts. This ceremony, and the closely related Acknowledgement of Country, became more popular during the 1990s, having been promoted by the Council for Aboriginal Reconciliation and taken up in the aftermath of the Mabo decision recognizing Aboriginal title. By the early 2000s, land acknowledgements had become commonplace in Australia. They became common in Canada subsequent to the release of the Truth and Reconciliation Commission final report in 2015. In the United States, they were increasing in prevalence in the early 2020s.

== By country ==
=== Australia ===
In Australia, the Acknowledgement of Country is related to but distinct from the Welcome to Country. A Welcome to Country is performed by a traditional owner/custodian of the land that one is currently on, while an Acknowledgement of Country may be performed by anyone. These customs are a rejection of the colonial idea of terra nullius, which was overturned by the Mabo decision in 1992. The Welcome to Country is a ritual performed that is intended to highlight the cultural significance of the surrounding area to a particular Aboriginal Australian or Torres Strait Islander clan or language group.

=== Canada ===
In Canada, land acknowledgments became more popular after the 2015 Truth and Reconciliation Commission report (which recognized that the country's Indian residential school system had amounted to cultural genocide) and the election of a Liberal majority led by Justin Trudeau that same year. By 2019, they were a regular practice at events including National Hockey League games, ballet performances, and parliament meetings.

At the beginning of the 2025 Speech from the Throne during the opening of the Parliament of Canada, King Charles III acknowledged that Ottawa was unceded territory of the Algonquin and Anishinaabeg people.

=== New Zealand ===
In New Zealand, land acknowledgments recognize the Indigenous Māori and Moriori peoples. Māori words are commonly used in greetings of public speakers, acknowledgments of publications, and legislation to recognize their presence. Usage of Māori place names before English place names similarly acknowledges Māori relations with the place.

=== United States ===
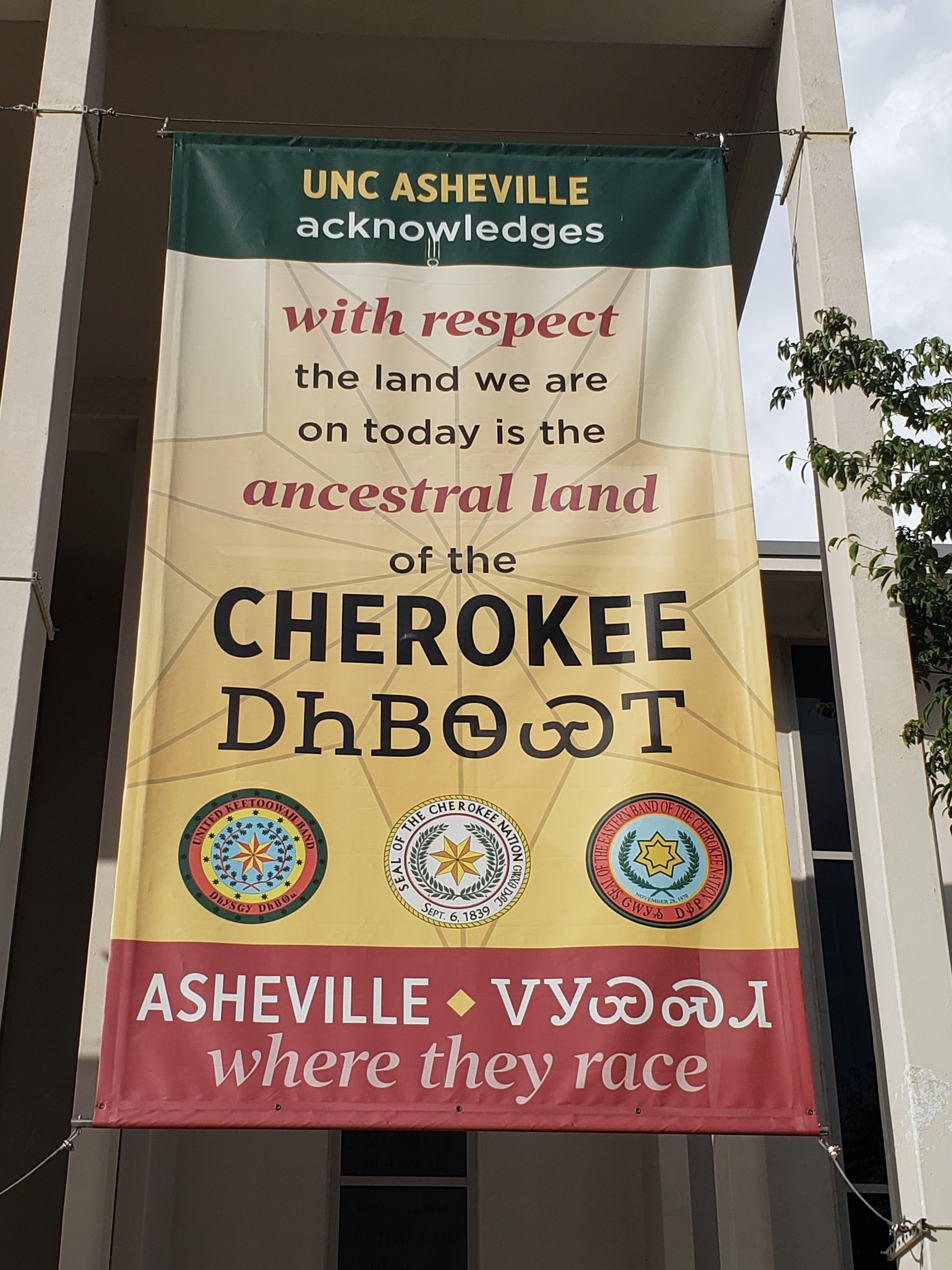
A banner at the University of North Carolina at Asheville acknowledging the Cherokee people as the indigenous people of the land, with Cherokee script

In the United States, the practice of land acknowledgments was gaining momentum as of 2019. Early adopters included arts institutions, museums, institutions of higher education, non-profit organizations, local governments, and churches. After the 2020 Oscar land acknowledgment statement by Taika Waititi, the practice has received more attention, both positive and negative. Native Governance Center has resources on the topic of land acknowledgment, as do a number of sites geared toward colleges and universities. In some cases in the United States, the term "land and labor acknowledgement" has been adopted to include recognition of historic usage of forced labor through slavery and acknowledging descendants of locally-enslaved peoples.

In 2025, the 9th Circuit Court of Appeals ruled in Reges v. Cauce that the University of Washington had violated the First Amendment rights of a professor by subjecting him to a prolonged investigation and reprimand for putting a parody land acknowledgment on a syllabus.

== Reception ==
Land acknowledgements have been criticized for being empty gestures that avoid addressing the issues of Indigenous communities in context. Ensuring the factual accuracy of acknowledgments can be difficult due to problems like conflicting land claims or unrecorded land exchanges between Indigenous nations. Some indigenous leaders and activists say land acknowledgements are a waste of time, while others suggest they can be a first step toward action favoring indigenous rights.

Graeme Wood has argued that a land acknowledgement delivered in any context besides the actual return of land is nothing more than a "highwayman's receipt", "moral exhibitionism", and "a counterfeit version of respect", and that such statements should be limited to occasions "that preserve their dignity and power". Kevin Gover has stated such statements can be inadvertently disempowering towards the very peoples to whom they are supposedly offered as a gesture of respect, by publicly highlighting the involuntary absence of those peoples from their traditional lands. Cutcha Risling Baldy has drawn an analogy between a land acknowledgement and a thief who steals a laptop, refuses to give it back to the true owner, and then attaches a plaque to publicly admit his crime, so that every time he uses the laptop in public, everyone will know that it used to be the victim's computer—which is cold comfort to the victim. Baldy argues it is better for land to be returned, or at least to describe specific, concrete actions the audience can take to assist indigenous peoples. Reid Walker writes that "Indigenous relationships to land were not about possession or title . . . we're putting a Western, colonial concept on the relationship between the Native people who were stewards of the land. It's not ownership."

== See also ==
- Ethnic nationalism
- Nativism (politics)
- Reconciliation in Australia
- Settler colonialism
- Virtue signaling
