= Statue of Elizabeth II (Toronto) =

Bronze sculpture in Toronto, Ontario, Canada

Statue of Queen Elizabeth II
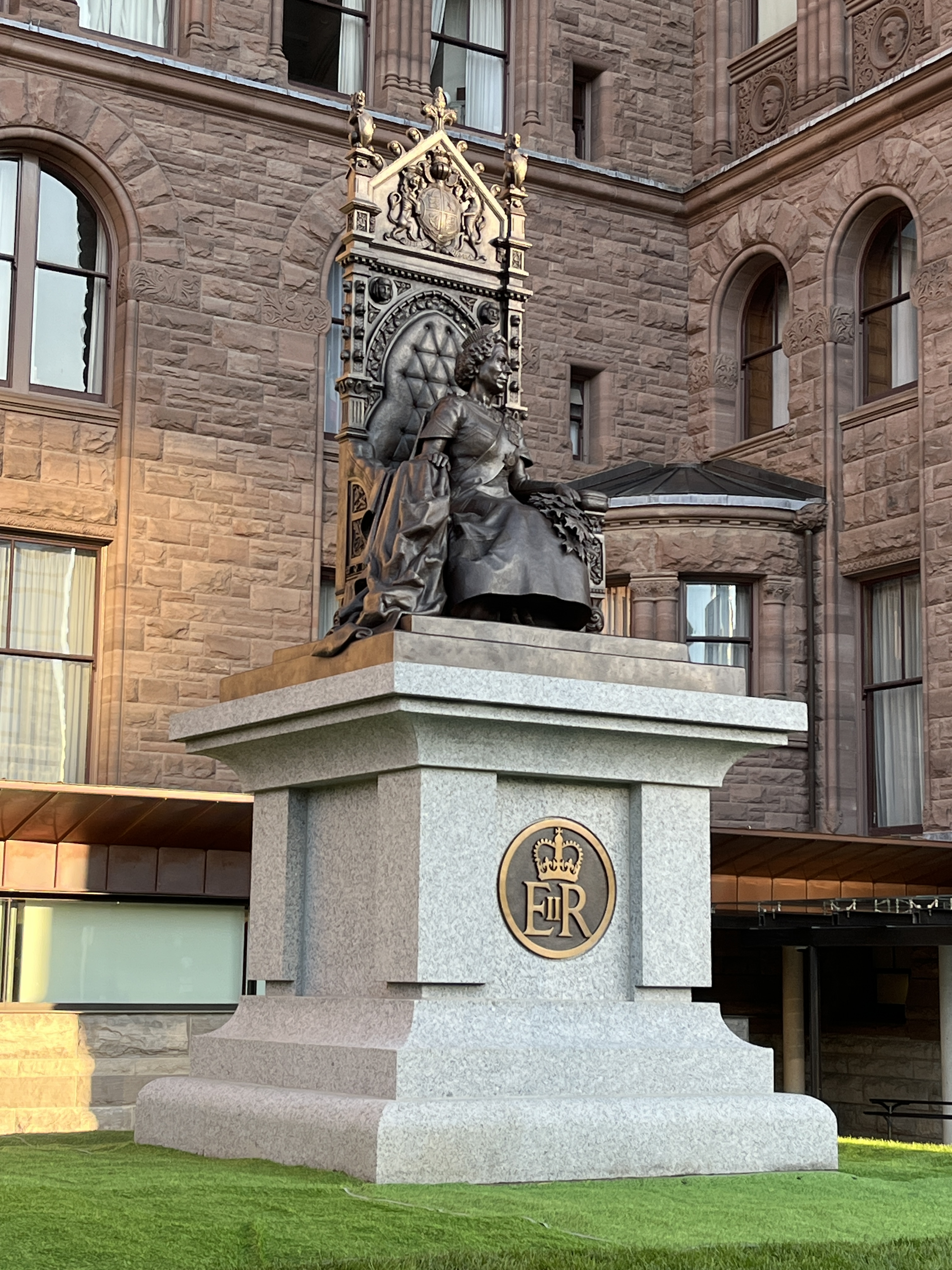
- The sculpture in 2023
- Year: 2023
- Medium: Bronze sculpture
- Subject: Elizabeth II
- Location: Toronto, Ontario, Canada; 43°39′43.7″N 79°23′30.8″W

A statue of Elizabeth II, Queen of Canada, stands in Queen's Park, in Toronto, Ontario. The bronze sculpture, depicting the Queen on the sovereign's throne from 1878, was unveiled in 2023.

== See also ==
- Royal monuments in Canada
