= Opening of the Parliament of Canada =

Ceremonial event

Charles III and Camilla open Parliament in 2025

The opening of the Parliament of Canada is the commencement of a session of the Parliament of Canada following a general election. It involves summons from the governor general on behalf of the monarch and a ceremony based on the same in the United Kingdom, though less elaborate and now evolved to include uniquely Canadian elements.

== Summons ==
At the same time as the governor general drops the writ for a federal election, the governor general also issues a royal proclamation summoning Parliament—setting the date for the opening of the next parliament following the election (though, the date may be amended by subsequent proclamations, so long as Parliament eventually meets as required by the Constitution Act, 1867). These read as follows:

TO ALL WHOM these Presents shall come or whom the same may in any way concern,

Greeting:

A proclamation

Whereas We are desirous to meet Our People of Canada as soon as may be and to have their advice in Parliament;

We do hereby, by and with the advice of Our Prime Minister of Canada, summon and call together the House of Commons of Canada, to meet at Our City of Ottawa, on [date], then and there to have conference and treaty with the Senate of Canada.

A later proclamation gives the precise time for parliament to open:

To Our beloved and faithful SENATORS of Canada, and MEMBERS elected to serve in the House of Commons of Canada, and to all whom these Presents may in any way concern,

Greeting:

A proclamation

Whereas Our Parliament of Canada was dissolved on [date];

Therefore We, by these Presents, command each of you and all others interested in this behalf to appear in person on [date], at [time] at Our City of Ottawa, for the DISPATCH OF BUSINESS, to treat, do, act, and conclude upon those things that Our Parliament of Canada may, by the Grace of God, ordain.

Of the governor general's deputies, only the justices of the Supreme Court can summon Parliament (though they, like the other deputies, may not dissolve it).

== Opening of parliament ==
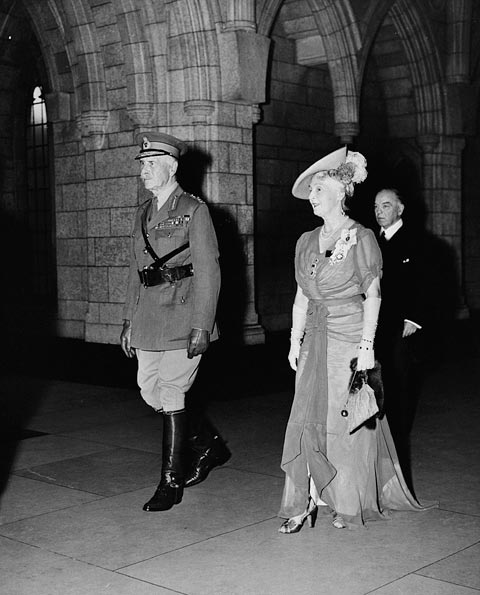
Governor General The Earl of Athlone, with his wife and viceregal consort, Princess Alice, Countess of Athlone, arriving at the Centre Block for the opening of the 20th Canadian Parliament, 6 September 1945; though hostilities had ceased four days earlier, Canada was still technically at war

Canada has two types of opening for the federal Parliament. While both include the monarch, governor general, or another delegate reading the throne speech, they are differentiated by scale: Larger openings, called bench openings, require a rearrangment of the seating in the Senate to accommodate the number of official guests—the justices of the Supreme Court, lieutenant governors, former prime ministers, members of the King's Privy Council for Canada, members of the diplomatic corps, and any spouses—and the galleries are reserved for other guests. Smaller openings, called desk openings, do not require the removal of senators' desks, as guests are limited to the justices of the supreme court, invitees of the governor general and prime minister, and the deans of the diplomatic corps. The speaker of the Senate establishes the guest list, though the size of the ceremony is determined by the prime minister.

The opening of the first session of a parliament takes place over two days; the opening of a subsequent session of the same parliament requires only one day. On the first, routine business is conducted. After such is concluded, the speaker of the Senate commands the usher of the Black Rod (usually called simply black rod) to summon the members of the House of Commons to the Senate. Once assembled, the speaker addresses the congregation, stating "honourable members of the Senate, members of the House of Commons: I have it in command to let you know his [or her] excellency the governor general does not see fit to declare the causes of his [or her] summoning of the present Parliament of Canada, until a speaker of the House of Commons shall have been chosen, according to law; but tomorrow, [date], at [time], his [or her] excellency will declare the causes of his [or her] calling this parliament." The members of Parliament then return to the Commons to elect the speaker for that chamber. The speech itself is delivered the following day.

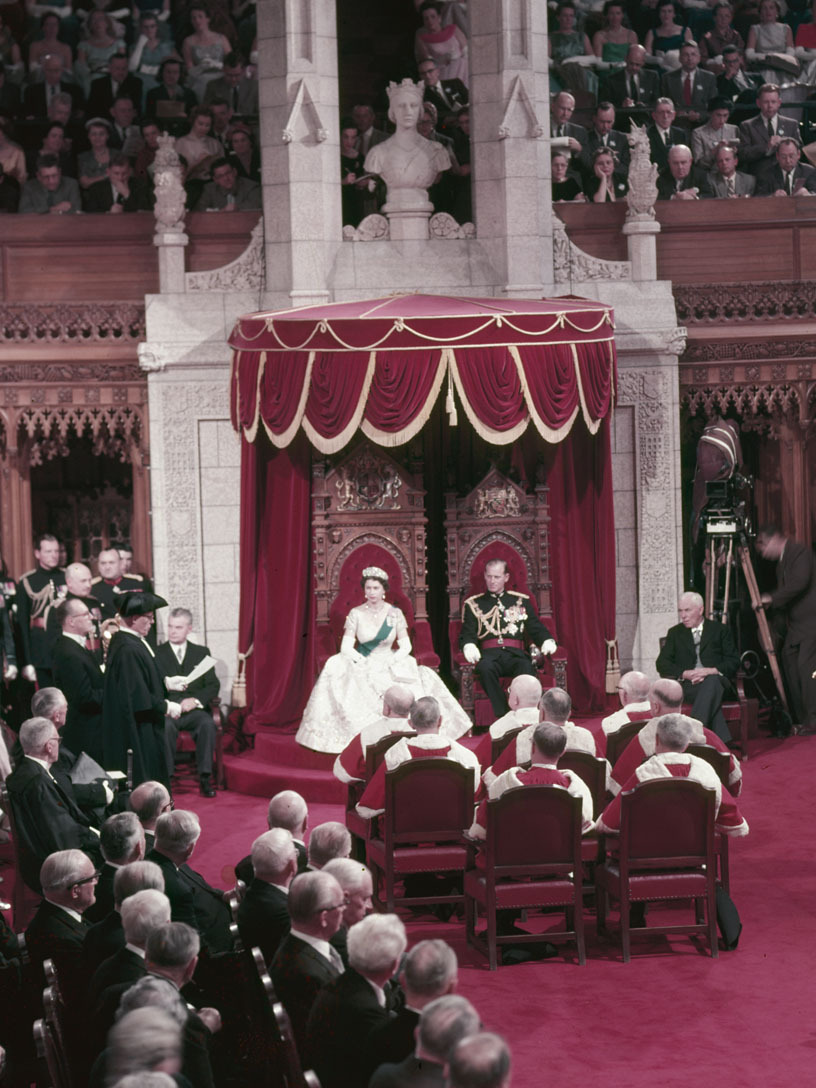
Queen Elizabeth II and Prince Philip, Duke of Edinburgh, at the opening of Parliament, 14 October 1957. The justices of the Supreme Court sit at centre, in front of the monarch. The mace bearer stands at far right. The Prime Minister, John Diefenbaker, sits to the sovereign's immediate right.

As the King's representative, the governor general attends Parliament to deliver the speech from the throne, although this can and has been done by the sovereign themselves or another representative. The sovereign has specifically delivered the speech only three times in Canadian history; Queen Elizabeth II in 1957 and 1977, and King Charles III in 2025.

Accompanied by four officers of the Royal Canadian Mounted Police, the governor general usually rides in the State Landau, often accompanied by the viceregal consort, between Rideau Hall and Parliament Hill, where the governor general inspects a Canadian Armed Forces guard of honour. Once the viceroy is in the Parliament building, the usher of the Black Rod is again sent to call the members of the House of Commons to the Senate. Upon arrival at the bar of the Senate, the speaker of the House of Commons addresses their counterpart in the Senate, asserting the rights and privileges of the Commons and its members. The speaker of the Senate, on behalf of the governor general, responds that the Crown will "recognise and allow their constitutional privileges". The governor general, seated on the throne, then reads the throne speech, during which the Senate's mace is held by the Mace Bearer, who stands to the side of the throne.

== Debate ==
The address is followed by a debate and vote in both houses of Parliament. Formally, the motion merely calls on Parliament to thank the monarch or viceroy for the speech via an address in reply. Until 1897, this was a more detailed message, covering the content of the throne speech point by point. Today, in the Senate, it takes the form of simply:

That the following Address be presented to His [or Her] Excellency the Governor General of Canada

To Her [or His] Excellency the Right Honourable [name], Chancellor and Principal Companion of the Order of Canada, Chancellor and Commander of the Order of Military Merit, Chancellor and Commander of the Order of Merit of the Police Forces, Governor General and Commander-in-Chief of Canada.

MAY IT PLEASE YOUR EXCELLENCY:

We, His [or Her] Majesty's most loyal and dutiful subjects, the Senate of Canada in Parliament assembled, beg leave to offer our humble thanks to Your Excellency for the gracious Speech which Your Excellency has addressed to both Houses of Parliament.

The debate is, however, often wide-ranging, exploring many aspects of the government's proposed policies, and spread over several days. When the address in reply is eventually voted on, the vote, if an amendment expressing a lack of confidence in the ministry is moved and carried, is held to constitute a Motion of no confidence in the government, resulting in the end of that government's mandate. This discussion and vote follows a symbolic raising of other matters, designed to highlight the independence of Parliament from the Crown; a practice that originated after King Charles I was tried and executed by the Parliament of England. In the Senate, it is Bill S-1, an Act Relating to Railways.

== Provincial parliaments ==
=== British Columbia ===
Ahead of the opening of the provincial legislature, the lieutenant governor of British Columbia, representing the Canadian monarch, arrives at the Parliament Buildings to a 15-gun salute fired by cannons brought into Victoria's inner harbour. The viceroy will inspect the guard of honour in front of the legislature before entering the building via the ceremonial entrance.

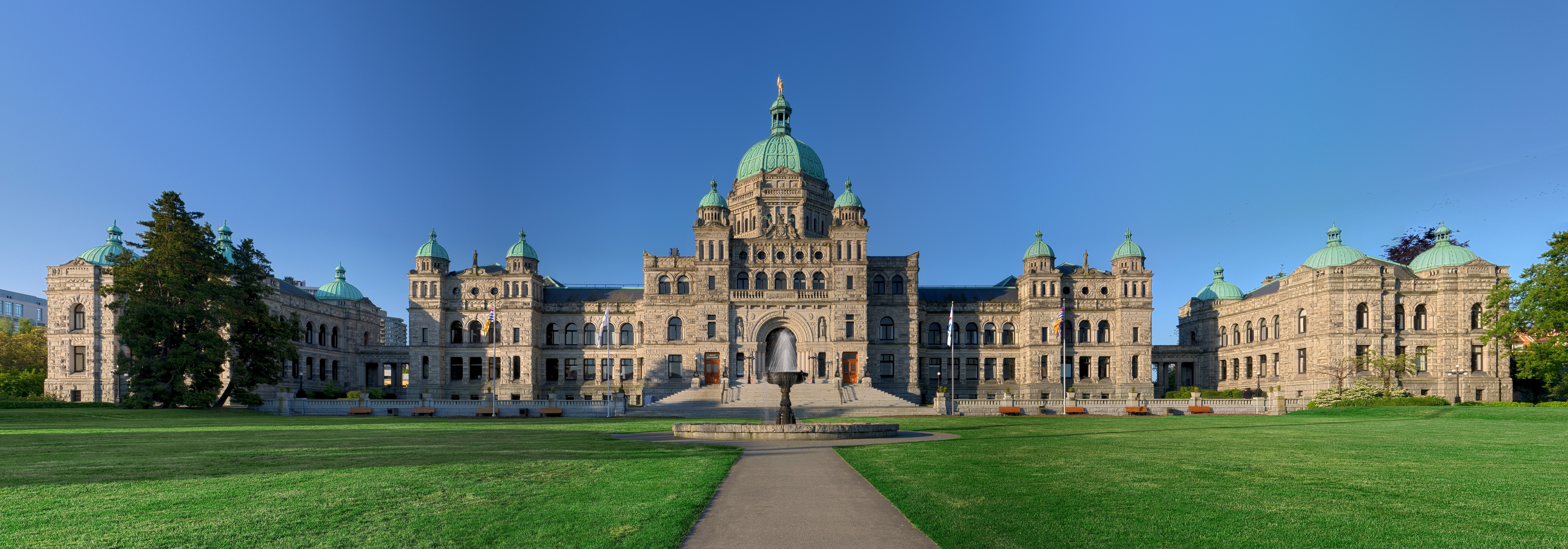
The Parliament Buildings of British Columbia in Victoria

Inside the legislative chamber, where members of the Legislative Assembly (MLAs), invited guests, and the press have gathered, the lieutenant governor takes the speaker's chair as the throne. From there, the viceroy recites the speech from the throne.

Thereafter, six days are set aside for the MLAs to debate the Executive Council's agenda as spelled out in the throne speech. The debate is regarded as the address in reply, begun by a minister of the Crown tabling a motion to thank the viceroy for his or her speech. At this point, His Majesty's Loyal Opposition may criticize the government's priorities. The vote on the address in reply, however, is of paramount importance, as it is considered a confidence vote; if an amendment expressing lack of confidence in the government is supported by the majority of MLAs, the ministry must either resign or the prime minister must advise the lieutenant governor to call an election.

=== Nova Scotia ===
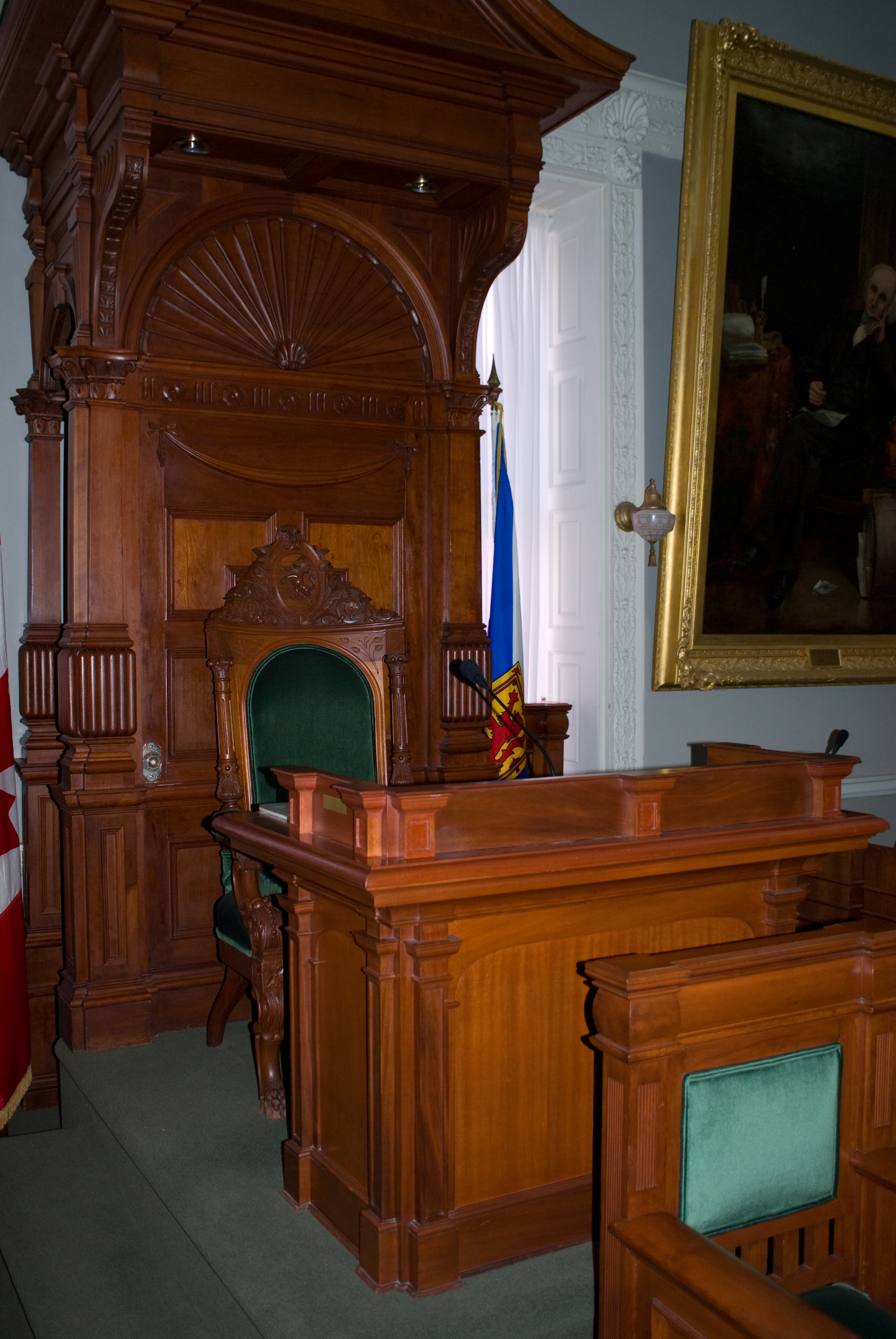
The speaker's chair, used by the lieutenant governor of Nova Scotia as a throne from which to deliver the throne speech in the legislative chamber of the Legislative Assembly of Nova Scotia

Following a general election, the Legislative Assembly of Nova Scotia is summoned to Province House, in Halifax, by the monarch's representative, the lieutenant governor of Nova Scotia. After the viceroy has commanded the assembly to elect a speaker, and has approved the new speaker, the lieutenant governor declares the new legislative session open. The viceroy, typically wearing civil uniform, arrives at the parliament building, being greeted by a Canadian Armed Forces guard of honour and band, taking the royal salute, followed by a 15-gun salute on Citadel Hill and flag party. The lieutenant governor then enters Province House through a phalanx formed by the official escort.

Inside the assembly chamber, the seargeant-at-arms announces the lieutenant governor's arrival. The latter is escorted to the speaker's chair, which is used for the occasion as a throne, though the province does have a separate throne. The viceroy then delivers the throne speech, setting out the ministry’s agenda for the legislative session.

Once the speech is concluded and the lieutenant governor departs, the speaker takes his or her chair. An Act Respecting Oaths of Office is introduced by the minister of justice as a pro forma bill, symbolizing the independence of the legislature from the Crown. The address in reply is made following debate on the throne speech, initiated by a cabinet minister and seconded by another and a speech from the leader of His Majesty's Loyal Opposition. This is often when new members of the assembly will make their maiden speech. The address in reply remains on the order paper for the entirety of the session and may, at any moment, be called for debate.

== See also ==
- State Opening of Parliament
- Thrones of Canada
