= Thrones of Canada =

Chairs for Canada's royal and viceregal figures

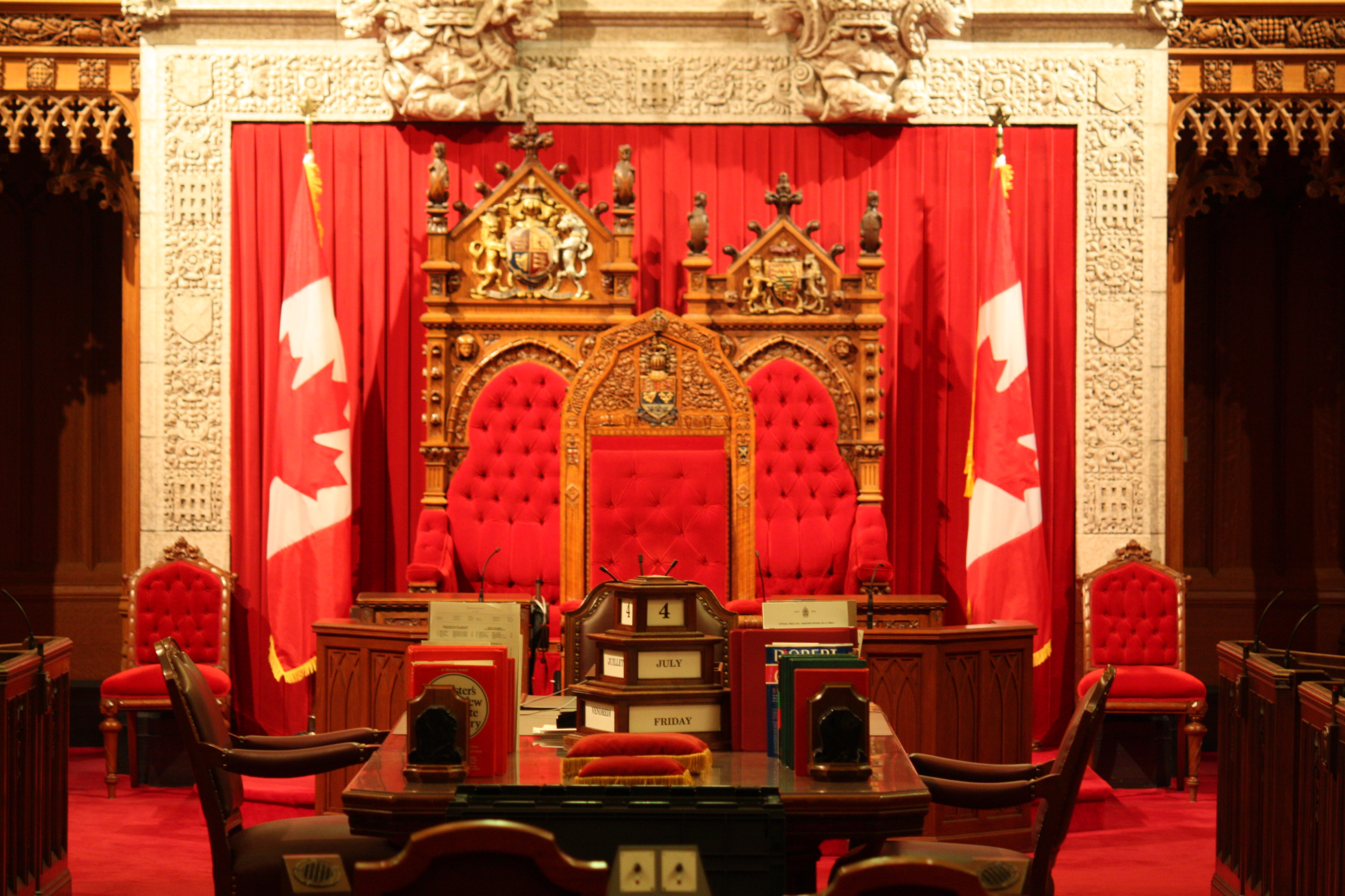
The throne of Canada (left) and throne for the royal consort (right)—both commissioned in 1878—behind the speaker's chair in the Senate

The thrones of Canada are the chairs for the monarch and royal consort or governor general and viceregal consort, usually located in the Senate chamber of Parliament. There are presently two sets of thrones for the federal Parliament, the first commissioned in 1878 and currently undergoing restoration, and the second, made in 2017, in use in the temporary Senate, while the Centre Block of Parliament is under renovation. There are also thrones for the lieutenant governors representing the monarch in each provincial legislature.

== Use ==
Since Confederation in 1867, a throne has always been present in the Senate chamber, signifying the connection between Crown and Parliament. The sovereign, or the governor general representing the sovereign, sits in the monarch's throne to read the speech from the throne, as part of the opening of Parliament. To grant royal assent to bills passed by the Commons and Senate, the governor general sits "at the foot of the throne", that is, in the speaker's chair. The governor general also uses the sovereign's throne at their installation ceremony. If the sovereign or governor general is accompanied by their consort, the latter sits on the consort's throne, to the left of the sovereign's. The 1878 thrones have occasionally been moved outside for ceremonies on Parliament Hill, such as the centennial of Confederation in 1967 and the signing of the Constitution Act, 1982.

In the legislature of each province, the relevant lieutenant governor uses the speaker's chair for a throne and there is no throne for the viceregal consort in those parliaments.

== Federal parliament ==
=== 1878 thrones ===
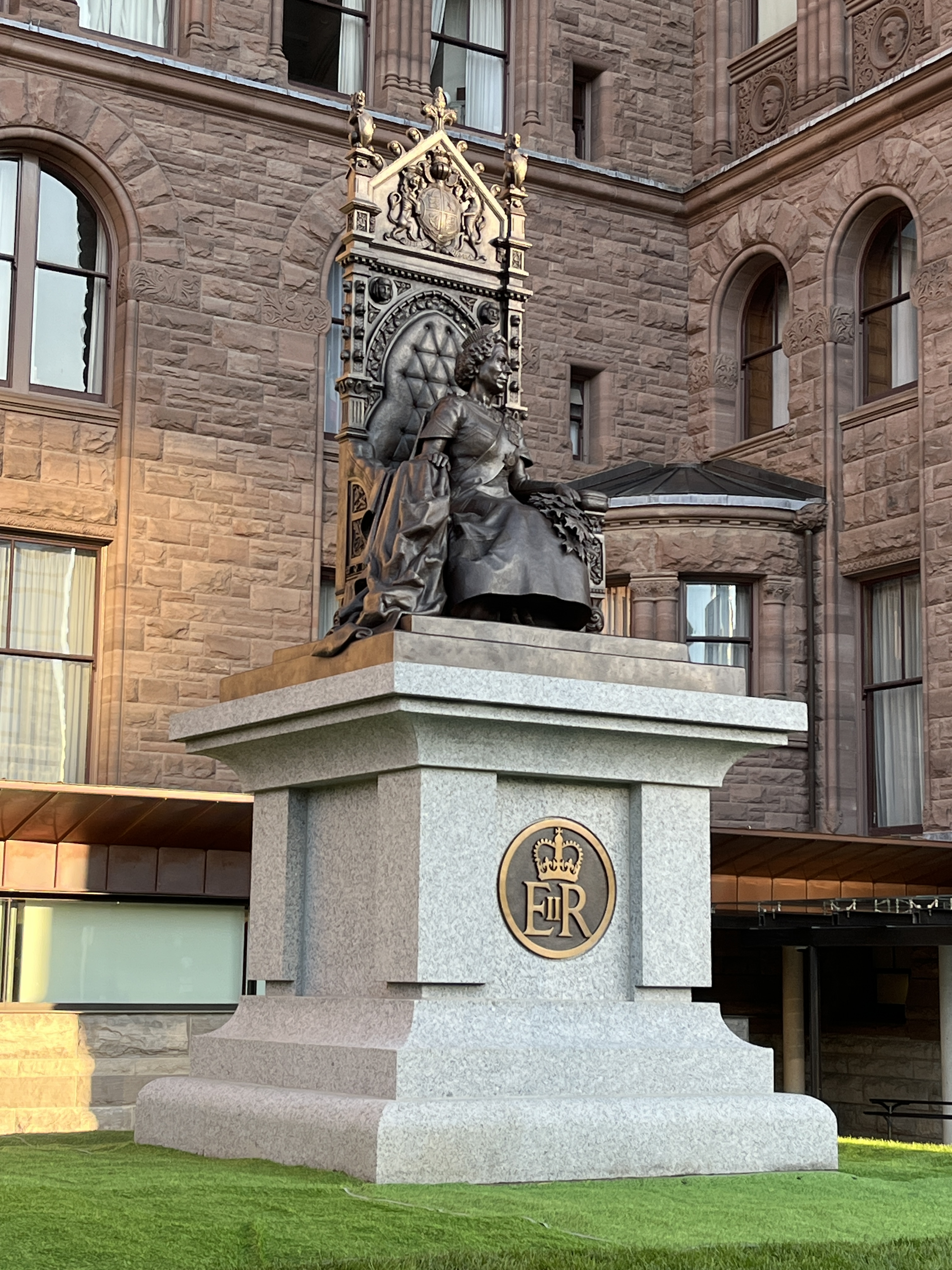
The 1878 monarch's throne as part of a statue of Elizabeth II, Queen of Canada, in Queen's Park in Toronto, Ontario

The thrones in the Senate chamber of Parliament were commissioned in 1878, ahead of the arrival of John Campbell, Marquess of Lorne, as Governor General of Canada, accompanied by his wife, Princess Louise, who would serve as viceregal consort. The chairs were made by the Toronto firm Holbrook & Mollington, costing $329.70, and are made of oak, carved in the style of 19th century Gothic Revival, including vines, oak leaves, and medallion heads. The monarch's throne bears a carved rendition of the royal coat of arms of the United Kingdom (as Canada was then under the British monarch) and the consort's chair, designed specifically for Princess Louise, has her personal coat of arms on the headpiece. The carved faces on either side of each throne are unidentified; they are possibly the visages of the craftsmen who constructed the thrones.

For Queen Elizabeth II's Silver Jubilee in 1977, the monarch's throne was depicted on a commemorative silver dollar. The throne is also recreated as part of a statue of Queen Elizabeth II in front of the Ontario Legislative Building in Toronto.

=== 2017 thrones ===
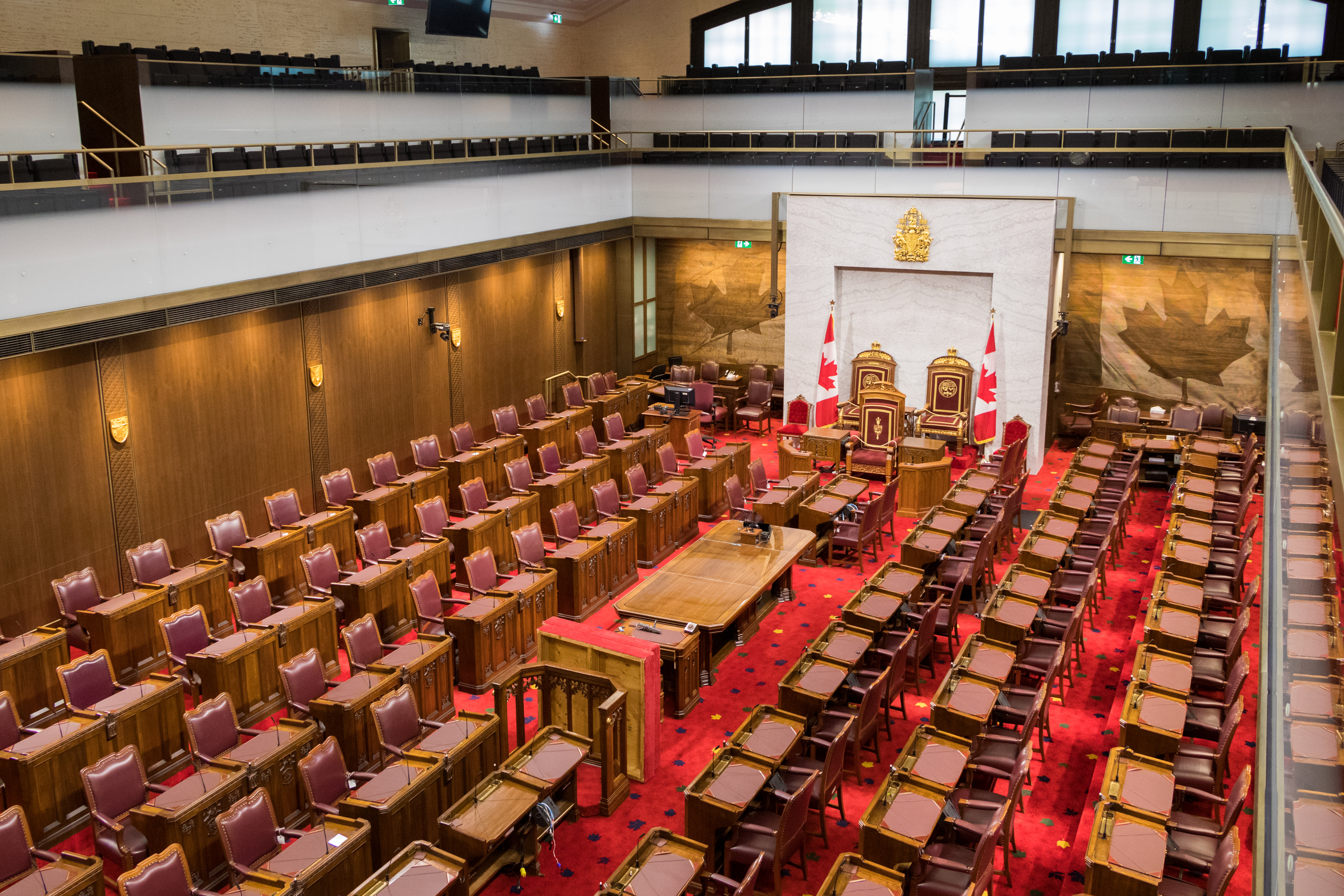
The sovereign's throne (left) and royal consort's throne (right)—made in 2017 using English walnut from Windsor Great Park, donated by Queen Elizabeth II—behind the speaker's chair in the temporary Senate chamber

To commemorate the sesquicentennial of Confederation in 2017, and while the Centre Block of Parliament is under renovation and the Senate is relocated to the Senate of Canada Building, a pair of thrones and a speaker's chair were commissioned from Dominion Sculptor Phil White. These were designed in a Neoclassical style that both meshes with the Beaux-Arts architecture of the building and draws inspiration from the thrones John Pearson, the architect of the Centre Block, conceived of in the 1920s. Using English walnut from Windsor Great Park that was donated by Canada's then-reigning monarch, Queen Elizabeth II, the thrones were completed by craftsmen and upholsterers from Ontario and Quebec. The royal cypher of Elizabeth II is carved and gilded on the headpiece of the sovereign's throne and it and the consort's throne bear crowns atop the headpieces and the escutcheon (shield) and ribbon of the Royal Coat of Arms of Canada are embroidered on the chair backs. Lilies, symbolizing the monarchs of New France, and Tudor roses, for the monarchs of pre-Confederation Canada, adorn other parts of the thrones.

King Charles III and Queen Camilla seated on the 2017 thrones during the 2025 Speech from the Throne

The thrones were first used by a monarch when King Charles III opened parliament during the 2025 royal visit to Canada.

== Provincial parliaments ==
=== Nova Scotia ===
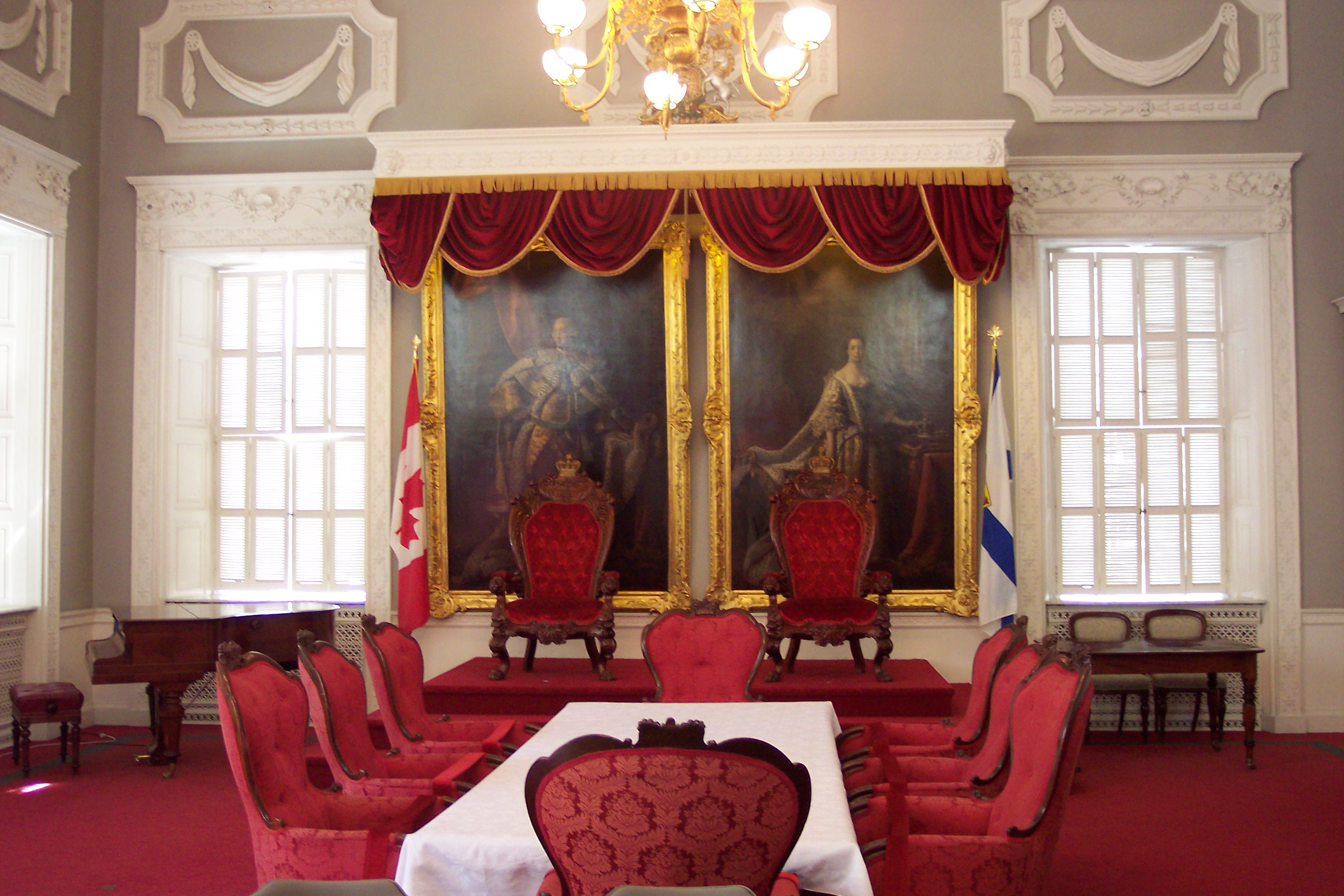
The thrones of Nova Scotia (at rear) in the Red Room of Province House in Halifax

Though the monarch's representative, the lieutenant governor of Nova Scotia, uses the speaker's chair in the legislative chamber of Province House to deliver the throne speech at the opening of parliament, the province does have separate thrones located in the legislature's Red Chamber, which was home of the parliament's upper house until 1928. Made from mahogany, the near-identical thrones—one for the monarch or lieutenant governor and the other for the royal or viceregal consort—bear rose, thistle, shamrock, and mayflower carved into headpieces, surmounted by St Edward's Crown on the sovereign's throne and the Crown of Queen Elizabeth the Queen Mother, on the slightly smaller consort's throne. Other parts of the thrones are covered in acanthus scrolls.

The first chair was made in 1860, for Prince Albert Edward, Prince of Wales (later King Edward VII), during his tour of the Maritimes and the Canadas that year. The second throne was made by A.H. MacMillan in 1939 for Queen Elizabeth, the consort of King George VI, during their royal tour of Canada. The thrones are positioned beneath portraits of King George III and Queen Charlotte.

=== Prince Edward Island ===
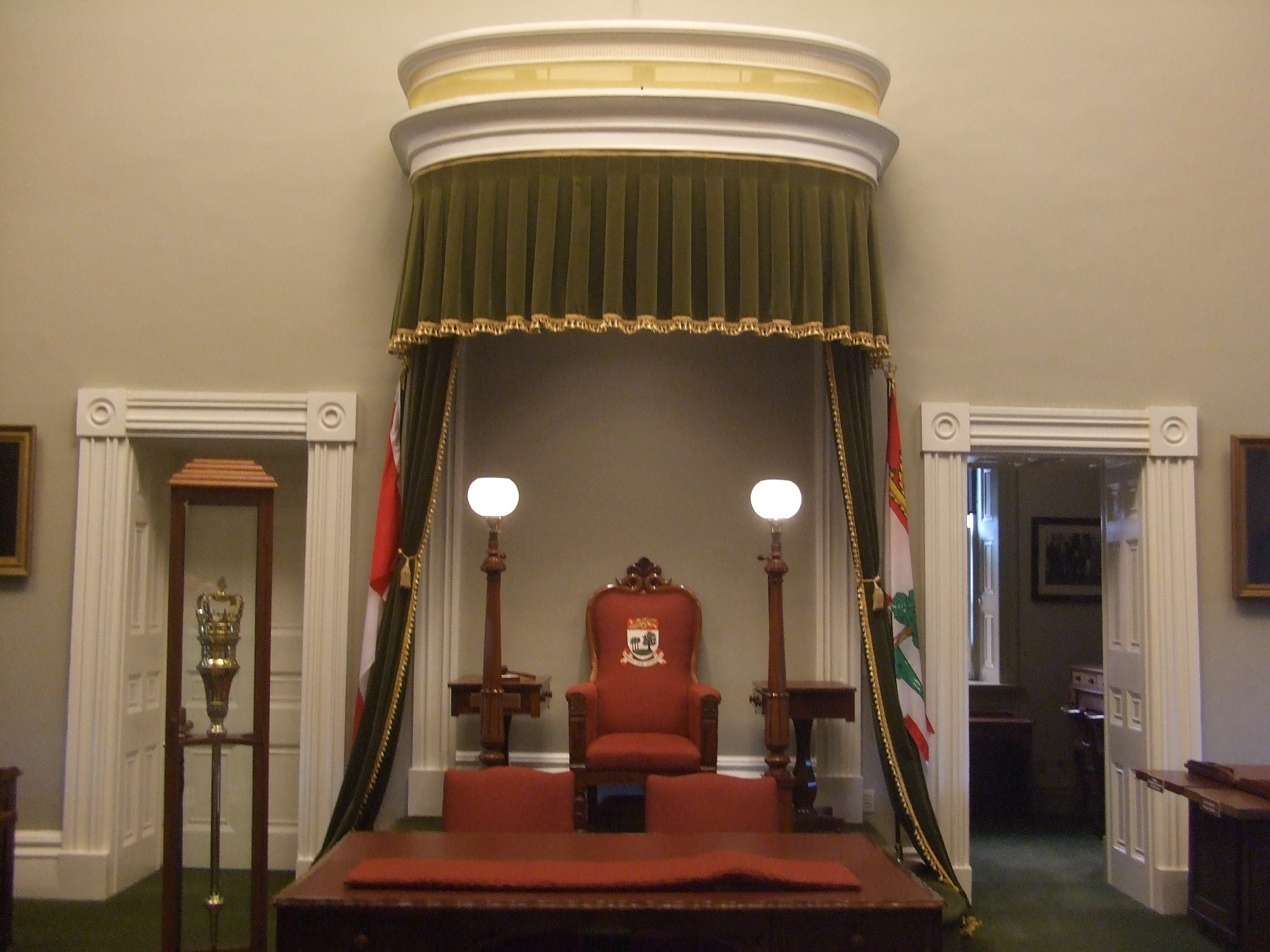
The speaker's chair in the Legislative Assembly of Prince Edward Island, used by the lieutenant governor as a throne when delivering the throne speech or giving royal assent

In the Confederation Chamber of Province House in Charlottetown is a chair formerly used by James Cummiskey as Speaker of the Legislative Council. It was also used as a throne by the lieutenant governor at formal openings of the legislative session. Catherine Hennessy, of the PEI Museum and Heritage Foundation, purchased the chair from Cummiskey's daughter, Kate MacKenzie, in 1970 and it was held in storage until Parks Canada began a renovation of Province House, including restoration of the chair.

The speaker of the Legislative Assembly's chair is now used as a throne by the lieutenant governor.
