= Canadianism =

Canadian ideology

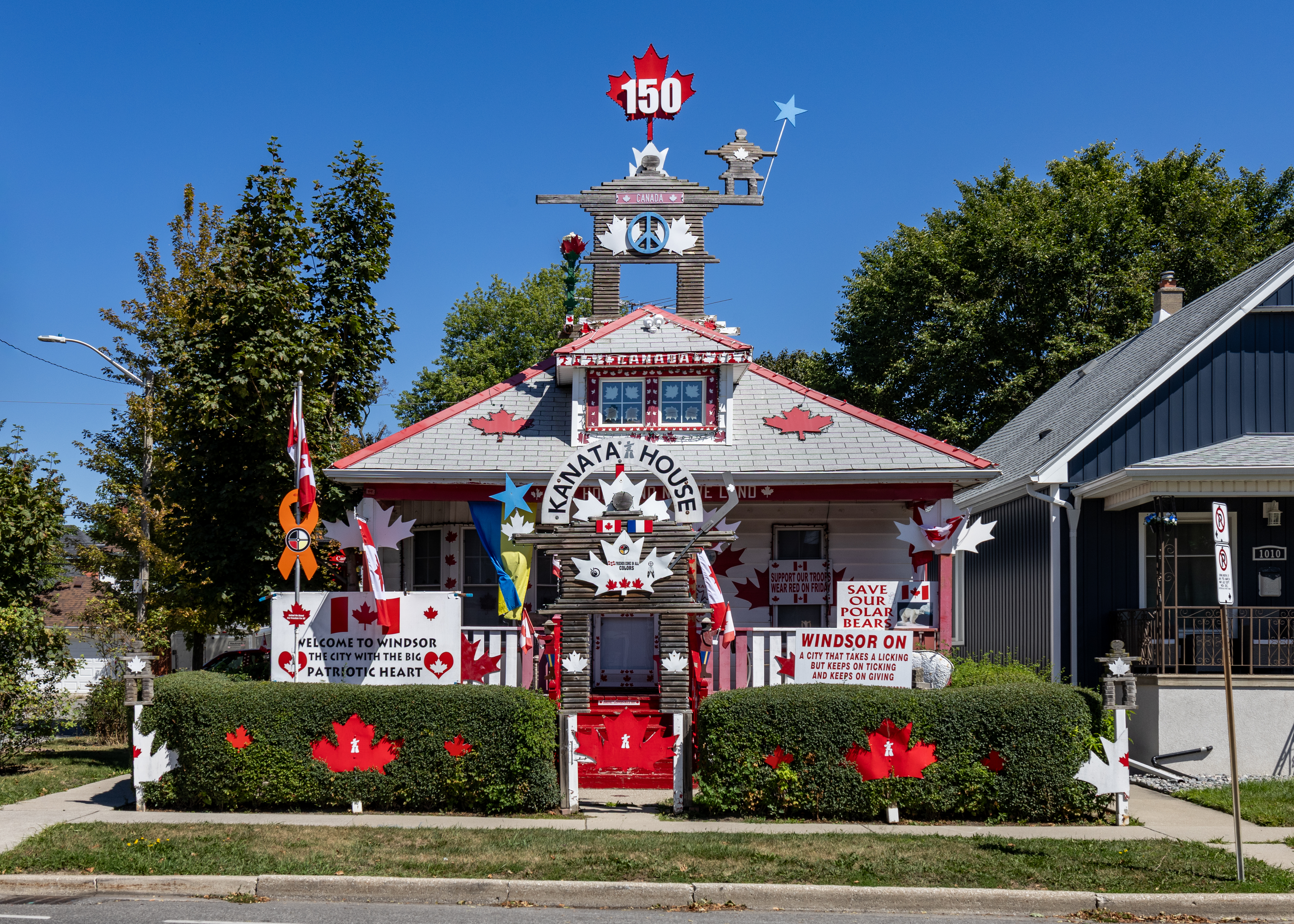
The "Kanata House" in Windsor, Ontario, decorated with numerous symbols of Canadian patriotism

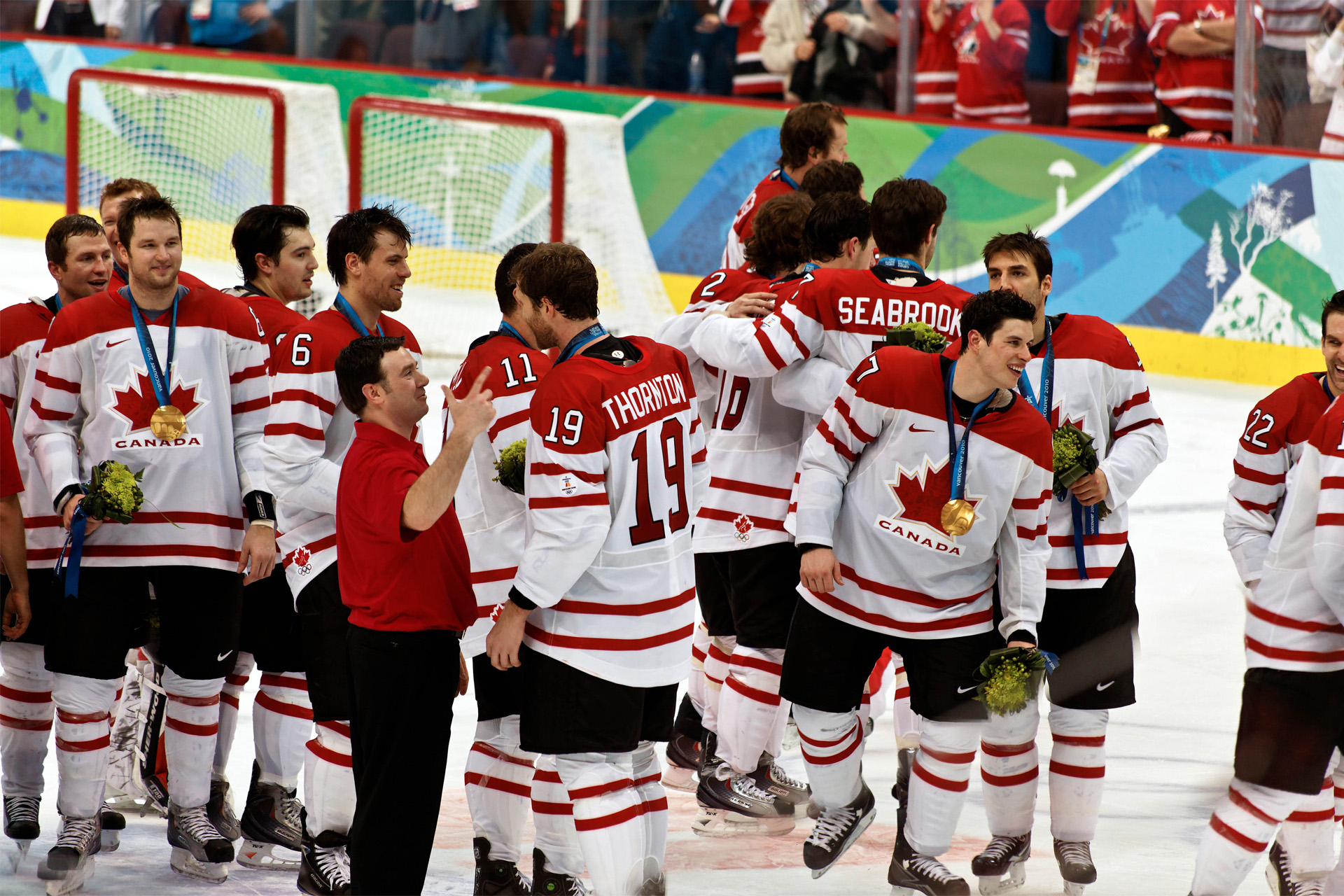
Canada men's national ice hockey team celebrate gold at the 2010 Winter Olympics in Vancouver

Canadianism (French: Canadianisme) or Canadian patriotism (French: Patriotisme canadien) is patriotism involving the cultural attachment of Canadians to Canada as their homeland. In contemporary times, this patriotism has increasingly centred on the principles of official bilingualism and civic nationalism that reflect the cultural mosaic of Canada. These principles contribute to the formation of a cohesive and distinct Canadian identity. It has been identified as related, though in some cases distinct, to Canadian nationalism.

== History ==
Canada's first prime minister, John A. Macdonald, worked with George-Étienne Cartier and other representatives, in founding the country, in which Canada was recognized as having been created by 'two founding races' which the Royal Commission on Bilingualism and Biculturalism later defined as 'Canadians of British and French origin' apart from 'the other ethnic groups' to the explicit exclusion of 'the Indians and the Eskimos' in its Book I. General Introduction, Paragraph 21, often referred to today as English Canadians and French Canadians.

Prime Minister Wilfrid Laurier in his 1911 electoral defeat speech, responded to various accusations by asserting his support for Canadianism, saying:

I am branded in Quebec as a traitor to the French and in Ontario as a traitor to the English. In Quebec I am branded as a Jingo, and in Ontario as a Separatist. In Quebec I am attacked as an Imperialist, and in Ontario as an anti-Imperialist. I am neither. I am a Canadian. Canada has been the inspiration of my life. I have before me as a pillar of fire by night and as a pillar of cloud by day a policy of true Canadianism, of moderation, of conciliation. I have followed it consistently since 1896, and now I appeal with confidence to the whole Canadian people to uphold me in this policy of sound Canadianism which makes for the greatness of our country and of the Empire.

Canadianism was especially important within the Liberal Party of Canada. Liberal Party figures such as O. D. Skelton neither rejected ties between Canada and United Kingdom, nor claimed that Canadians composed a unitary nation – taking into account rejections of this by French Canadian supporters of a Canadian patriotism, such as Henri Bourassa. Pierre Elliot Trudeau, as Prime Minister of Canada sought to develop a common Canadianism across cultural boundaries through advancing a Canadian society based upon civic rights, as manifested with the adoption of the Charter of Rights and Freedoms. Trudeau emphasized Canada as being a multicultural society, his vision of multiculturalism was individualist in associating cultural identity with individual choice.

The version of patriotism promoted by the Liberal Party that sought to distance Canada from the United Kingdom was initially strongly opposed by the Progressive Conservative Party of Canada (PC). Prime Minister John Diefenbaker of the PC Party, emphasized Canadian nationalism, asserting that there was "One Canada, One Nation", believing that the goal of Macdonald and Cartier of unifying the people of Canada could be achieved. Prior to becoming prime minister, Diefenbaker emphasized the need for Canadian identity to be reconcile unity and diversity, saying in 1946 during a debate in the House of Commons on citizenship: "Canada must develop, now that we achieve this citizenship, unity out of diversity...". In 1964, Diefenbaker rejected the then-proposed maple leaf flag for Canada by the Liberal government, because it held no reference to Britain and he claimed that did it honour the "founding races" of Canada, and demanded that any new flag have the British Union Jack and the emblems of the "founding races". The PCs later accepted the current Canadian flag, with the red maple leaf appearing on the party's logo in the 1970s. In 1980, PC leader Joe Clark, during his short tenure as prime minister, added a new element to the description of Canada's identity, describing Canada as a "community of communities" – in that Canadians could express multiple identities within a Canadian identity. Prime Minister Brian Mulroney and Clark as Constitutional Affairs Minister attempted to resolve political disagreement with Quebec over the Constitution Act of 1982 through propositions of constitutional reform in the failed Meech Lake and Charlottetown accords.

The successor to the PC Party, the Conservative Party of Canada, led by Prime Minister Stephen Harper recognized the Québécois as a nation within a united Canada. Harper later elaborated that the motion's definition of Québécois relies on personal decisions to self-identify as Québécois, and therefore is a personal choice.

The New Democratic Party of Canada (NDP) has influenced Canadian identity, particularly via former NDP leader and Saskatchewan Premier Tommy Douglas who was identified in a major public opinion poll by the Canadian Broadcasting Corporation (CBC) as the "Greatest Canadian", largely due to his advocacy for publicly funded universal health care for medically necessary services that was eventually adopted by Canada. NDP leader Jack Layton considered himself to be a Canadian idealist and stressed the importance of the Canadian context. Layton become a major figure in Canadian politics who upon his sudden death from cancer, was granted a state funeral in 2011 by Prime Minister Stephen Harper.

== See also ==
- Canadiana
- Canadian federalism
- Canadian folklore
- Canadian identity
- Canadian values
- Canadian studies
- The New Canada
