= Royal and viceregal transport in Canada =

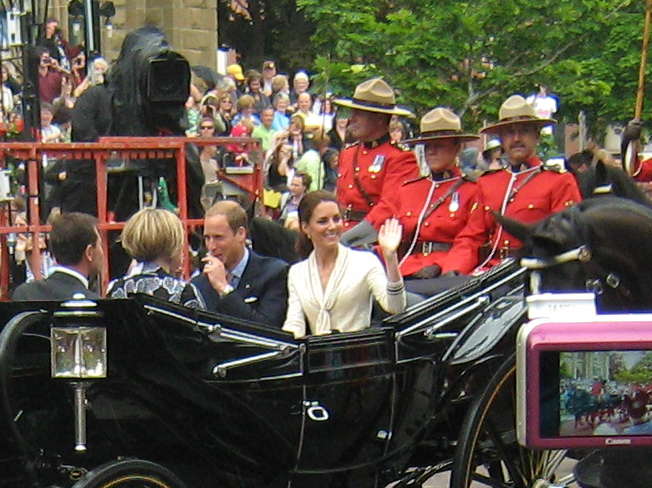
A carriage used to transport the Duke, and Duchess of Cambridge during the 2011 royal tour of Canada

Royal and viceroyal transport in Canada have included a variety of vehicles generally used for royal tours in Canada, and viceregal official and ceremonial duties in both the provincial and the federal spheres. The technology employed has mirrored the development of transportation since the late 17th century, when the first members of the Royal Family ventured from Great Britain to British North America. As the Canadian Royal Family is not predominantly resident in the country, those that belong to it have generally always had to make a trans-Atlantic crossing before switching to alternate over-land, water, or air transportation once in Canada.

== Royal favour ==
As different forms of transportation developed in the 19th and 20th centuries, members of the Royal Family, like the general public, used them all. For instance, Albert Edward, Prince of Wales (later King Edward VII), during the first true royal tour of Canada, which he undertook in 1860, was keen to try all the different forms of conveyance available, including steam ship and locomotive. His grandson, Edward, Prince of Wales, favoured American cars and became the first member of the Royal Family to pilot an airplane and, though his brother, King George VI, was predictable and sedate in his choice of transport, George's wife, Queen Elizabeth, tried everything from golf carts to helicopters. Similarly, Queen Elizabeth II has travelled in the state landau, a stagecoach, and monorail, the latter at her own personal request when touring Expo 67.

== Air ==
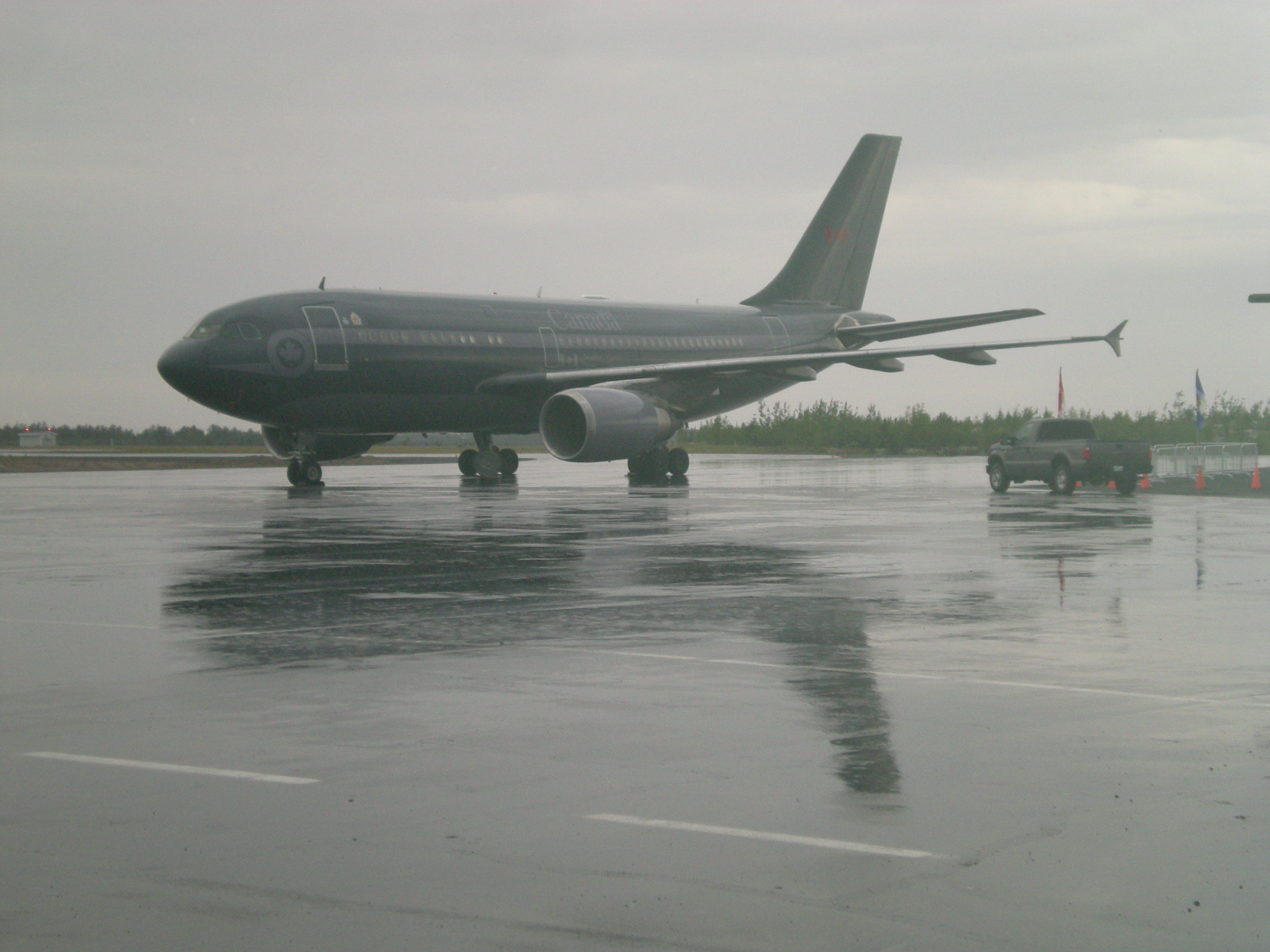
An RCAF CC-150 Polaris at Yellowknife Airport transporting the Duke and Duchess of Cambridge (2011)

The Royal Family has been mostly transported since the 1960s aboard the Canadian Royal Flight, originally using a CC-137 Husky (a variant of the Boeing 707 airliner), and currently using a customized CC-150 Polaris (a variant of the Airbus A310 airliner) flown by crews of 437 Transport Squadron, based at 8 Wing, Trenton, Ontario. 437 Squadron is part of the Air Transport Group, who, along with 412 Squadron in Ottawa, are charged with flying the Royal Family, the governor general, and other VIPs. Members of the Royal Family will also occasionally use commercial aircraft, such as when Queen Elizabeth II used a British Airways Concorde. Air Command helicopters and other aircraft are used where needed for shorter flights during segments of visits.

== Land ==
=== Carriage ===
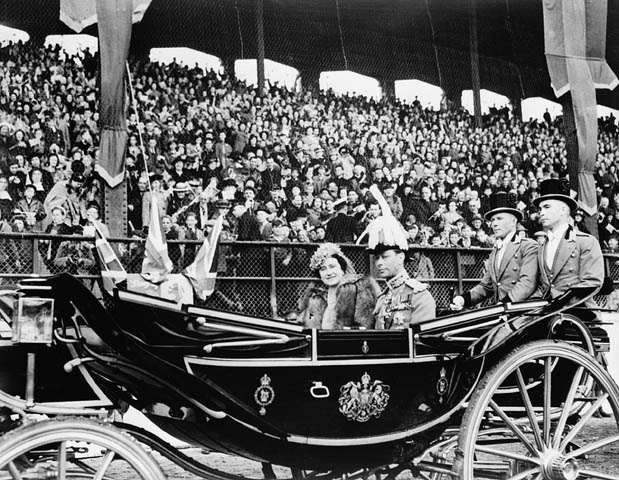
The Canadian State Landau in 1939

The Canadian state landau was originally purchased by Governor General the Earl Grey from the Governor-General of Australia, where the carriage had been built during the 1890s (made by Ewing Brothers Carriage Builders in Melbourne, Australia, from hand-carved wood and wrought-iron), and it was gifted by Lord Grey to the Crown in right of Canada in 1911. Except for a period during the Second World War, the landau has been used for ceremonial processions through Ottawa by the governor general or members of the royal family, typically between the royal residence of Rideau Hall and Parliament Hill. The landau has been maintained by the Royal Canadian Mounted Police since 1911.

Members of the royal family have also used a landau owned by the Woodbine Entertainment Group (formerly the Ontario Jockey Club), which was imported from the United Kingdom by E.P. Taylor in the 1960s. It has been used during the Queen's Plate at Woodbine Racetrack in Toronto.

=== Automobile ===
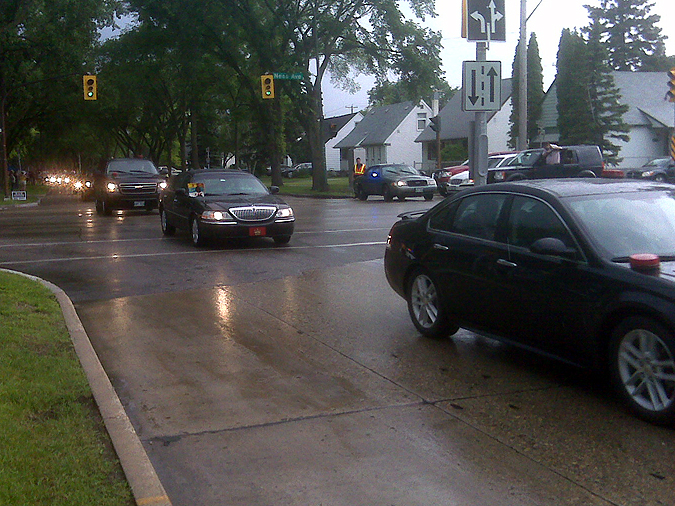
Motorcade transporting Elizabeth II during her 2010 royal tour. The sovereign's car bears a red licence plate with a gold St. Edward's Crown.

Cars have been employed frequently to transport members of the royal family and governors general around localized areas of Canada. In 1926, in anticipation of the 1927 royal tour of Canada undertaken by Prince Edward, Prince of Wales (later Edward VIII and then Duke of Windsor) and his brother Prince George, Duke of Kent, the first state cars of Canada (two McLaughlin-Buick seven-passenger open touring cars) were constructed for their use by General Motors Canada. McLaughlin Motor Car Company was a Canadian automobile company that produced cars under the marque McLaughlin, later branded McLaughlin-Buick, which was purchased in 1918 by General Motors and became its Canadian subsidiary, General Motors Canada. Two McLaughlin-Buick Phaetons were built for the 1939 royal tour of Canada. One of these later carried Prince Charles and Diana, Princess of Wales, during their 1986 visit to Canada. Elizabeth II's car bore a licence plate with a gold St. Edward's Crown on a red field.

=== Rail ===
Railways were a frequently used mode of transportation for royal and vice-royal parties from the mid-19th to mid-20th centuries; though, until the completion of the Canadian Pacific Railway (CPR), the viceregal party would have to pass through the United States in order to reach the western parts of Canada. Dedicated carriages were constructed and special trains reserved for official and private trips, but, unlike other vehicles, were never owned by the monarch, either as head of state or in a private capacity; instead, they were built and maintained by the railway companies—the Canadian National Railway (CNR) and the CPR—each always attempting to better the other in terms of luxury and conveniences. Prince Albert Edward was in 1860 the first royal to use a train in Canada; the CPR constructed for his tour two railway cars, one specifically for a sightseeing journey across the Victoria Bridge in Montreal after its opening by the Prince. Then, in the 1880s, Governor General the Marquess of Lorne and his wife, Princess Louise, were supplied with a railway car named Victoria for use in both travelling around the provinces and territories and as a mobile royal and vice-royal residence in parts of the country where amenities were minimal. When it was stopped at Pile o' Bones, which had just been designated the capital of the North-West Territories, it was in this car that the Princess in 1882 named the new community Regina, after her mother, the Queen.

For the 1901 tour of the Duke and Duchess of Cornwall and York (later King George V and Queen Mary), two railway cars were specially built by the CPR to serve as mobile royal quarters. One, named Cornwall, served as the day car, with a reception room panelled in Circassian walnut with blue and gold Louis XV ornament and fitted with a piano, as well as a dining room painted in a Watteau style, and a boudoir for the Duchess lined in silk. The other car, York, contained the bedrooms, reached through a green-velvet-lined vestibule, the Duke's in grey and crimson and the Duchess' in blue. Altogether the royal train, which always followed the viceregal and ministerial train, consisted of ten cars totalling 730 feet (220 m) in length, the remainder being Canada, with an additional five sleeping cabins; Sandringham, the staff dining car; South Africa, housing the secretaries' offices and medical dispensary; and Australia and India, with further sleeping quarters.

Three years later, the Alexandra was built and used as the primary VIP transport by members of the royal family, governors general, and prime ministers through to the 1920s. It was used, and, in contrast to his opinion of royal trains in Britain, enjoyed by Edward, Prince of Wales (later King Edward VIII), during his months-long tours of Canada; as he said in 1919: "I progressed westward in a magnificent special train provided by the Canadian Pacific Railway. My quarters were in the rear car, which had an observation platform. This last... while providing me with a continuous view of the varied Canadian landscape had however the drawback of making me vulnerable to demands for ad lib speeches from the crowds gathered at every stop." Four years later, the Prince briefly took the controls of the CPR 4-6-2 engine pulling the royal train.

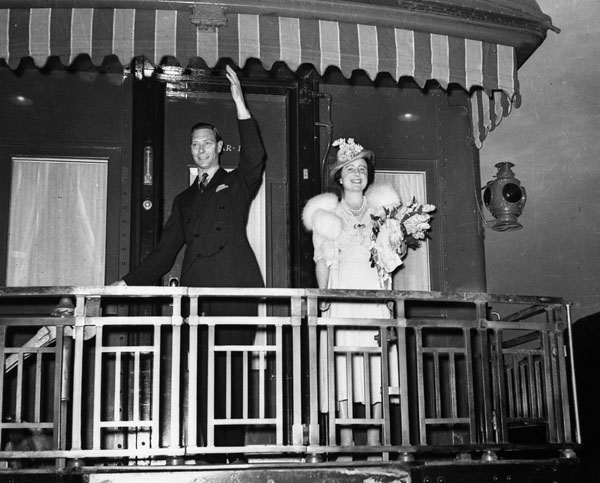
King George VI and Queen Elizabeth on the platform of the royal train during the 1939 royal tour of Canada

In 1926, two other carriages were built for state use: the Mount Stephen—which was used by the Duke and Duchess of Windsor; Princess Elizabeth and Prince Philip; Princess Margaret; and Princess Anne—and the Wentworth—which served as car number 5 (the accommodation for Prime Minister William Lyon Mackenzie King) of the royal train for the 1939 tour of King George VI and Queen Elizabeth. During that journey, the King, somewhat of a railbuff, rode in the engine cab when possible, and at the end of the trip gave his permission for the CPR both to use the prefix royal before the locomotive class' name of Hudson and to display the royal crown on the running boards of these engines. The engines and cars were sold and dispersed in later years; the Mount Stephen and Wentworth today form a part of the CPR's Royal Canadian Pacific train; the Royal Hudson No. 2850 resides at the Canadian Railway Museum; and the car Pacific, purchased by Paul Higgins, the former chairman of Mother Parker's, now sits unused on a spur line in Ajax, Ontario.

Until 1959, royal trains operated by the Canadian Pacific Railway and the federally-owned Canadian National Railways were used to transport Queen Elizabeth II and Prince Philip, Duke of Edinburgh, across the country. For them, and all royal parties before them travelling by train, precautions were taken ahead of the locomotive; railway line staff would be placed at platforms and on bridges for crowd control, a scout train would check for problems ahead of the royal train's arrival, and other trains that might be running parallel with the royal train were made to move at a different speed to prevent passengers looking into the royal carriages.

Today, the Royal Canadian Pacific train service operates in Western Canada and was given the 'Royal' designation in 2000.

== Water ==
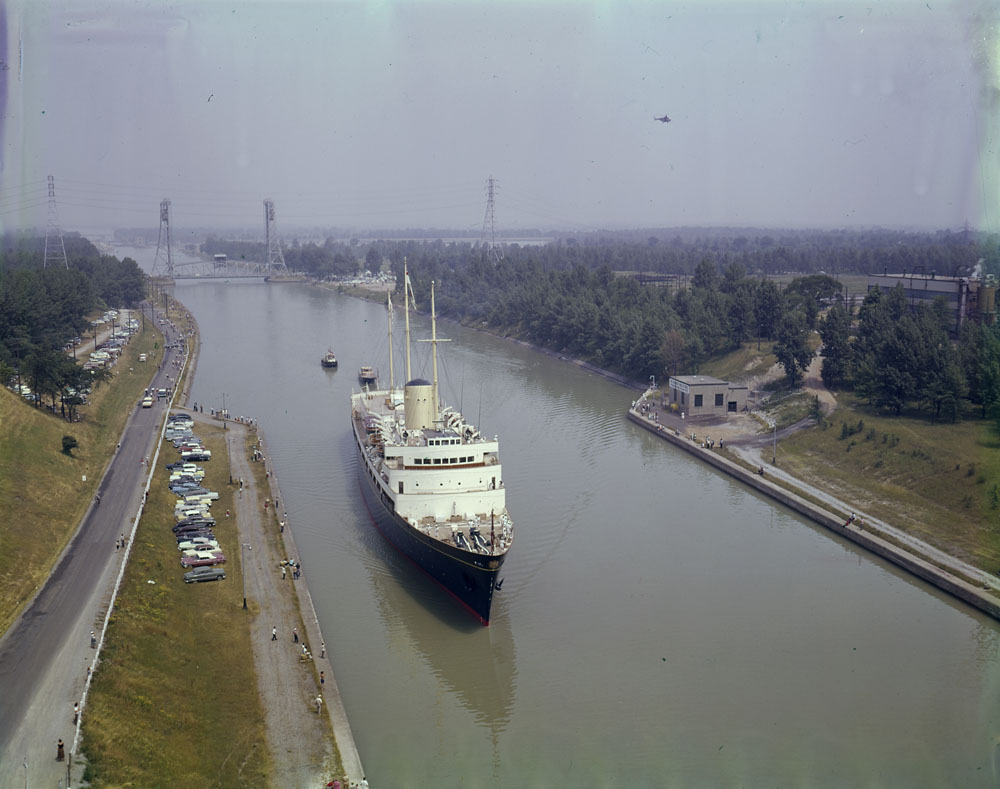
HMY Britannia passes through the Welland Canal during Elizabeth II's 1959 royal tour

Up until the middle of the 20th century, ships were frequently used for royal and vice-regal tours of Canada. Members of the Royal Family would voyage from the United Kingdom to the east coast of Canada at Halifax or Saint John, or transit the Saint Lawrence River to Quebec City; from one of these ports they would then embark on a train for overland journey. The ships used were either commercial or military; for their 1939 tour, King George VI and Queen Elizabeth travelled across the Atlantic on the Canadian Pacific ship RMS Empress of Australia for the westbound voyage, and on the RMS Empress of Britain eastbound. The royal yacht HMY Britannia was completed in 1954, and after the opening of the Saint Lawrence Seaway in 1959, could sail into the Great Lakes. This ship was decommissioned in 1997, however, and last sailed in Canadian waters in the summer of 1983, when it carried Charles, Prince of Wales, and Diana, Princess of Wales.

== See also ==
- Air transport of the British royal family and government
- Air transports of heads of state and government
- Royal tours of Canada
