= Monarchy of Canada =

King of Canada
- Roi du Canada
- Federal
- Arms of the King of Canada

Incumbent
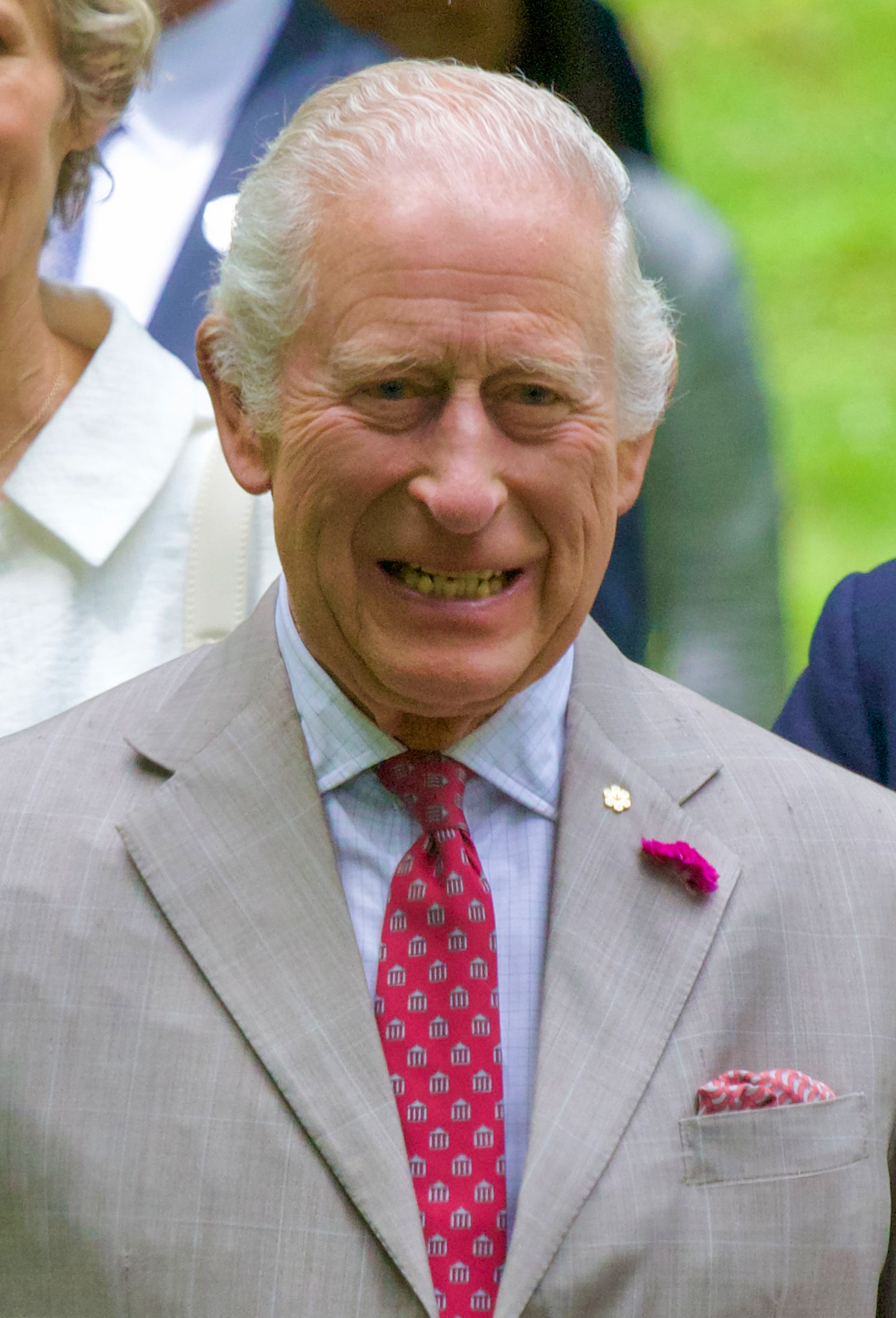
- Charles III since 8 September 2022

Details
- Style: His Majesty
- Heir apparent: William, Prince of Wales
- Represented by: Louise Arbour, the governor general of Canada
- Website: canada.ca/monarchy-crown

The monarchy of Canada is Canada's form of government embodied by the Canadian sovereign and head of state. It is one of the key components of Canadian sovereignty and sits at the core of Canada's constitutional federal structure and Westminster-style parliamentary democracy. The monarchy is the foundation of the executive (King-in-Council), legislative (King-in-Parliament), and judicial (King-on-the-Bench) branches of both federal and provincial jurisdictions. The current monarch is King Charles III, who has reigned since 8 September 2022.

Although the sovereign is shared with 14 other independent countries within the Commonwealth of Nations, each country's monarchy is separate and legally distinct. As a result, the current monarch is officially titled King of Canada and, in this capacity, he and other members of the royal family undertake public and private functions domestically and abroad as representatives of Canada. However, the monarch is the only member of the royal family with any constitutional role.

The monarch lives in the United Kingdom, and almost all of the royal governmental and ceremonial duties in Canada are carried out by the monarch's representative, the governor general of Canada (the main exception being the appointment of the governor general themself, and the extraordinary appointment of extra senators). In each of Canada's provinces, the monarchy is represented by a lieutenant governor. As territories fall under the federal jurisdiction, they each have a commissioner, rather than a lieutenant governor, who represents the federal Crown-in-Council directly.

All executive authority is vested in the sovereign, so the monarch's consent is necessary for letters patent and orders-in-council to have legal effect. As well, the monarch is part of the Parliament of Canada, so royal assent is required to allow for bills to become law. While the power for these acts stems from the Canadian people through the constitutional conventions of democracy, executive authority remains vested in the Crown and is only entrusted by the sovereign to the government on behalf of the people. This underlines the Crown's role in safeguarding the rights, freedoms, and democratic system of government of Canadians, reinforcing the fact that "governments are the servants of the people and not the reverse". Thus, within Canada's constitutional monarchy the sovereign's direct participation in any of these areas of governance is normally limited, with the sovereign typically exercising executive authority only with the advice and consent of the Cabinet of Canada, and the sovereign's legislative and judicial responsibilities largely carried out through the Parliament of Canada as well as judges and justices of the peace. There are, though, cases where the sovereign or their representative would have a duty to act directly and independently under the doctrine of necessity to prevent genuinely unconstitutional acts. In these respects, the sovereign and his viceroys are custodians of the Crown's reserve powers and represent the "power of the people above government and political parties". Put another way, the Crown functions as the guarantor of Canada's continuous and stable governance and as a nonpartisan safeguard against the abuse of power.

Canada has been described as "one of the oldest continuing monarchies in the world" of today. Parts of what is now Canada have been under a monarchy since as early as the 15th century as a result of colonial settlement and often competing claims made on territory in the name of the English (and later British) and French crowns. (Note: The date of the first establishment of monarchy in Canada varies: some sources give the year as 1497, when John Cabot landed somewhere along the North American coast (most likely Nova Scotia or Newfoundland) claiming an undefined extent of land for King Henry VII, while others put it at 1534, when the colony of Canada was founded in the name of King Francis I. Historian Carolyn Harris places the beginning of Canada's monarchical government at the appointment of Samuel de Champlain as Governor of New France, representing King Louis XIII, in 1627.) Monarchical government has developed as the result of colonization by the French colonial empire and British Empire competing for territory in North America and a corresponding succession of French and British sovereigns reigning over New France and British America, respectively. As a result of the conquest of New France, claims by French monarchs were extinguished and what became British North America came under the hegemony of the British monarchy which ultimately evolved into the Canadian monarchy of today. With the exception of Newfoundland from 1649 to 1660, no part of what is now Canada has been a republic or part of a republic; though, there have been isolated calls for the country to become one. The Crown, however, is considered to be "entrenched" into the governmental framework. The institution that is Canada's system of constitutional monarchy is sometimes colloquially referred to as the Maple Crown (Note: The term was first coined by Governor General the Lord Grey in 1905, when he stated in a telegram to King Edward VII regarding the inauguration of Alberta and Saskatchewan into Confederation: "[each one] a new leaf in Your Majesty's Maple Crown".) or Crown of Maples, Canada having developed a "recognizably Canadian brand of monarchy".

== International and domestic aspects ==
Commonwealth realms Overseas territories of Commonwealth realms The 15 realms of which King Charles III is the reigning sovereign

The monarch is shared in a personal union with 14 other Commonwealth realms within the 56-member Commonwealth of Nations. As he resides in the United Kingdom, viceroys (the governor general of Canada in the federal sphere and a lieutenant governor in each province) represent the sovereign in Canada and are able to carry out most of the royal governmental duties, even when the monarch is in the country (Note: For instance, Governor General Jules Léger ended the second session of the 30th Canadian Parliament on 17 October 1977, while Queen Elizabeth II was in Ottawa to deliver the Speech from the Throne at the opening of the third session on 18 October. Governor General Adrienne Clarkson granted royal assent to four bills on 19 May 2005, while Queen Elizabeth II was touring Saskatchewan and Alberta to mark the 100th anniversary of those provinces joining Confederation.) Nevertheless, the monarch can carry out Canadian constitutional and ceremonial duties abroad. (Note: The sovereign has carried out foreign relations as the representative uniquely of Canada.) (Note: For example, Queen Elizabeth II was in the United Kingdom when she signed the proclamation of the National Flag of Canada in 1965. King George VI was in the United Kingdom when, as king of Canada, he declared war on Germany in 1939.)

The evolution of the role of the governor general from being both a representative of the sovereign and an "agent of the British government" who " in matters deemed to be of 'imperial' concern... acted on the instructions of the British Colonial Office" to being solely a representative of the monarch developed with a rise in Canadian nationalism following the end of the First World War culminating in the passage of the Statute of Westminster in 1931. Since then, the Crown has had both a shared and a separate character: the sovereign's role as monarch of Canada has been distinct from their position as monarch of any other realm, including the United Kingdom. (Note: The English Court of Appeal ruled in 1982, while "there is only one person who is the Sovereign within the British Commonwealth [...] in matters of law and government the Queen of the United Kingdom, for example, is entirely independent and distinct from the Queen of Canada.") Only Canadian federal ministers of the Crown may advise the sovereign on any and all matters of the Canadian state, (Note: In 1997, UK Prime Minister Tony Blair intended to offer a life peerage to Canadian businessman Conrad Black. However, citing the 1919 Nickle Resolution, the Canadian Cabinet advised the Queen not to grant Black such an honour. If Blair had not yielded, the Queen would have been in the situation of having to grant an honour on the advice of her British Prime Minister and to object to the same as Queen of Canada on the advice of Canadian Prime Minister Jean Chrétien.) of which the sovereign, when not in Canada, is kept abreast by weekly communications with the federal viceroy. The monarchy thus ceased to be an exclusively British institution and, in Canada, became a Canadian, or "domesticated", establishment, though it is still often denoted as "British" in both legal and common language, for reasons historical, political, and of convenience.

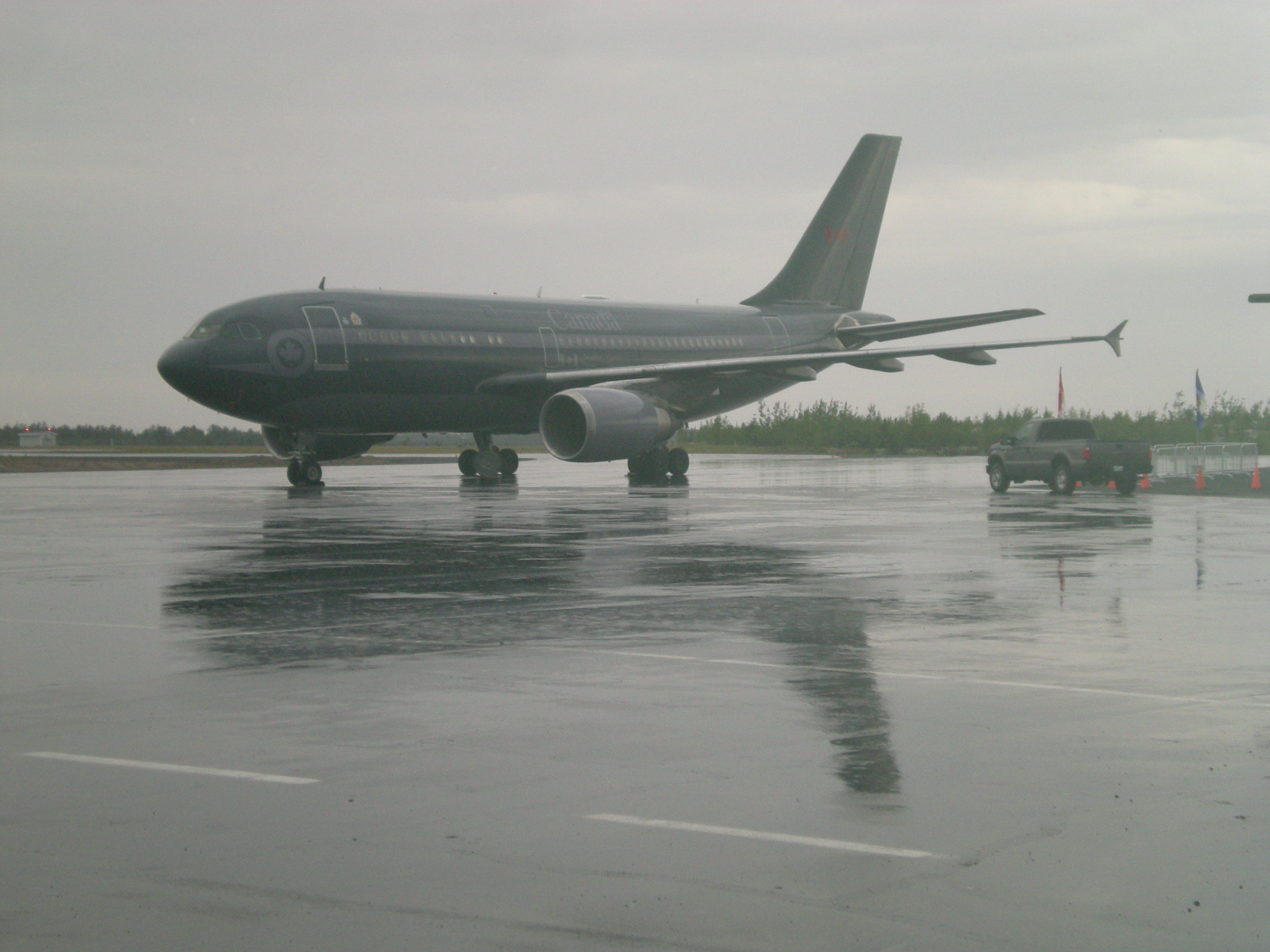
A Royal Canadian Air Force Royal Flight, used to transport the Duke and Duchess of Cambridge during their 2011 royal tour of Canada.

This division is illustrated in a number of ways: The sovereign, for example, holds a unique Canadian title and, when he and other members of the royal family are acting in public specifically as representatives of Canada, they use, where possible, Canadian symbols, including the country's national flag, unique royal symbols, armed forces uniforms, and the like, as well as Canadian Forces aircraft or other Canadian-owned vehicles for travel. Once in Canadian airspace, or arrived at a Canadian event taking place abroad, the Canadian secretary to the King, officers of the Royal Canadian Mounted Police (RCMP), and other Canadian officials will take over from whichever of their other realms' counterparts were previously escorting the King or other member of the royal family.

The sovereign similarly only draws from Canadian funds for support in the performance of his duties when in Canada or acting as King of Canada abroad; Canadians do not pay any money to the King or any other member of the royal family, either towards personal income or to support royal residences outside of Canada.

There are five aspects to the monarchy of Canada: constitutional (such as the use of the royal prerogative in summoning and dissolving parliament, granting royal assent), national (delivering the Speech from the Throne and the Royal Christmas Message, distributing honours, decorations, and medals, and partaking in Remembrance Day ceremonies), international (the monarch being head of state in other Commonwealth realms, and being the head of the Commonwealth), religious (the words by the grace of God in the monarch's title, the Act of Settlement, 1701, requiring the sovereign to be Anglican, and the monarch encouraging people "to tolerate, accept, and understand cultures, beliefs, and faiths different from our own"), and the welfare and service monarchy (seen in members of the royal family founding charities and supporting others, fundraising for charity, and giving royal patronage to civil and military organizations).

=== Succession and regency ===
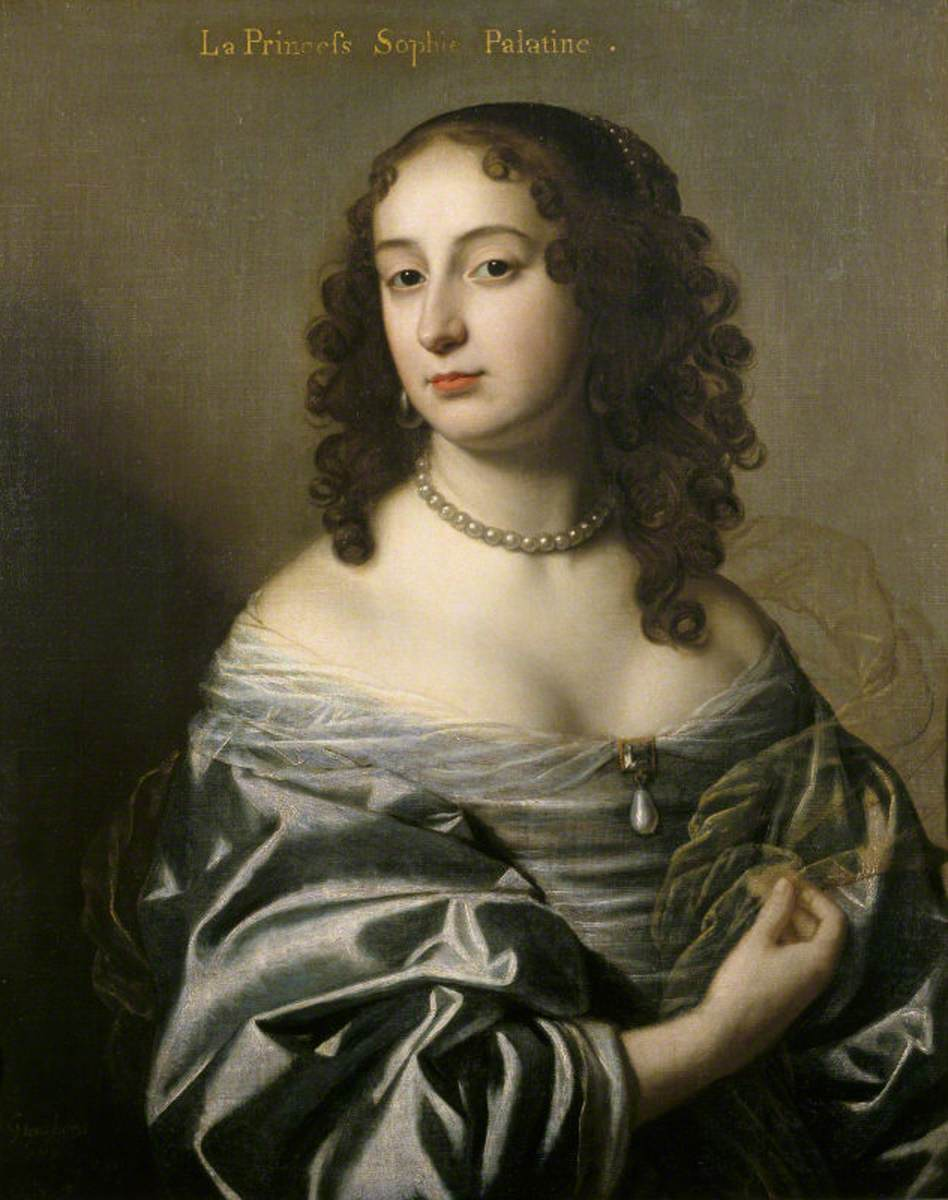
Sophia, Electress of Hanover, from whom heirs to the throne must directly descend

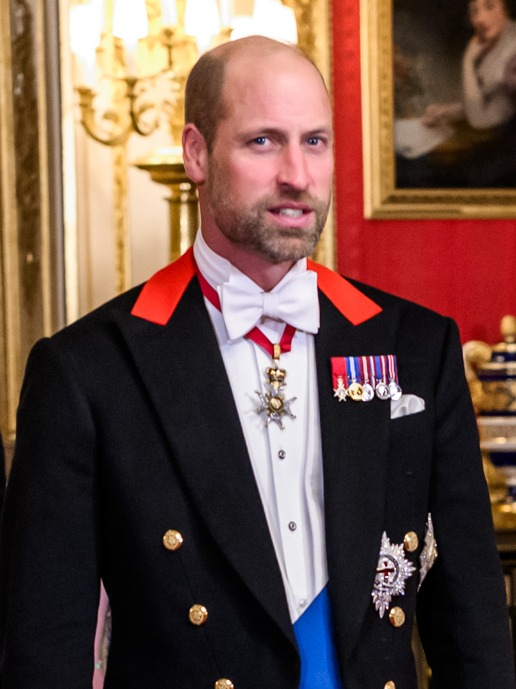
William, Prince of Wales, heir apparent to the Canadian throne

As in the other Commonwealth realms, the current heir apparent to the Canadian throne is William, Prince of Wales, who is followed in the line of succession by his eldest child, Prince George.

==== Demise of the Crown and accession ====
Upon the death of the monarch, there is an immediate and automatic succession by the late sovereign's heir; hence the phrase, "the King is dead. Long live the King". No confirmation or further ceremony is necessary. The federal cabinet and civil service follow the Manual of Official Procedure of the Government of Canada in carrying out various formalities around the transition.

By custom, the accession of a new monarch is publicly proclaimed by the governor general-in-council, who meet at Rideau Hall immediately upon the previous monarch's death. Since the adoption of the Statute of Westminster it has been considered "constitutionally inappropriate" for Canada's accession proclamations to be approved by a British order-in-council, as the monarch has, since then, assumed the Canadian throne according to Canadian law. For the accession of Charles III, the first since the creation of the Canadian Heraldic Authority in 1989, the Chief Herald read the royal proclamation aloud. If Parliament is in session, the Prime Minister will announce the demise of the Crown there and move for a joint address of sympathy and loyalty to the new monarch.

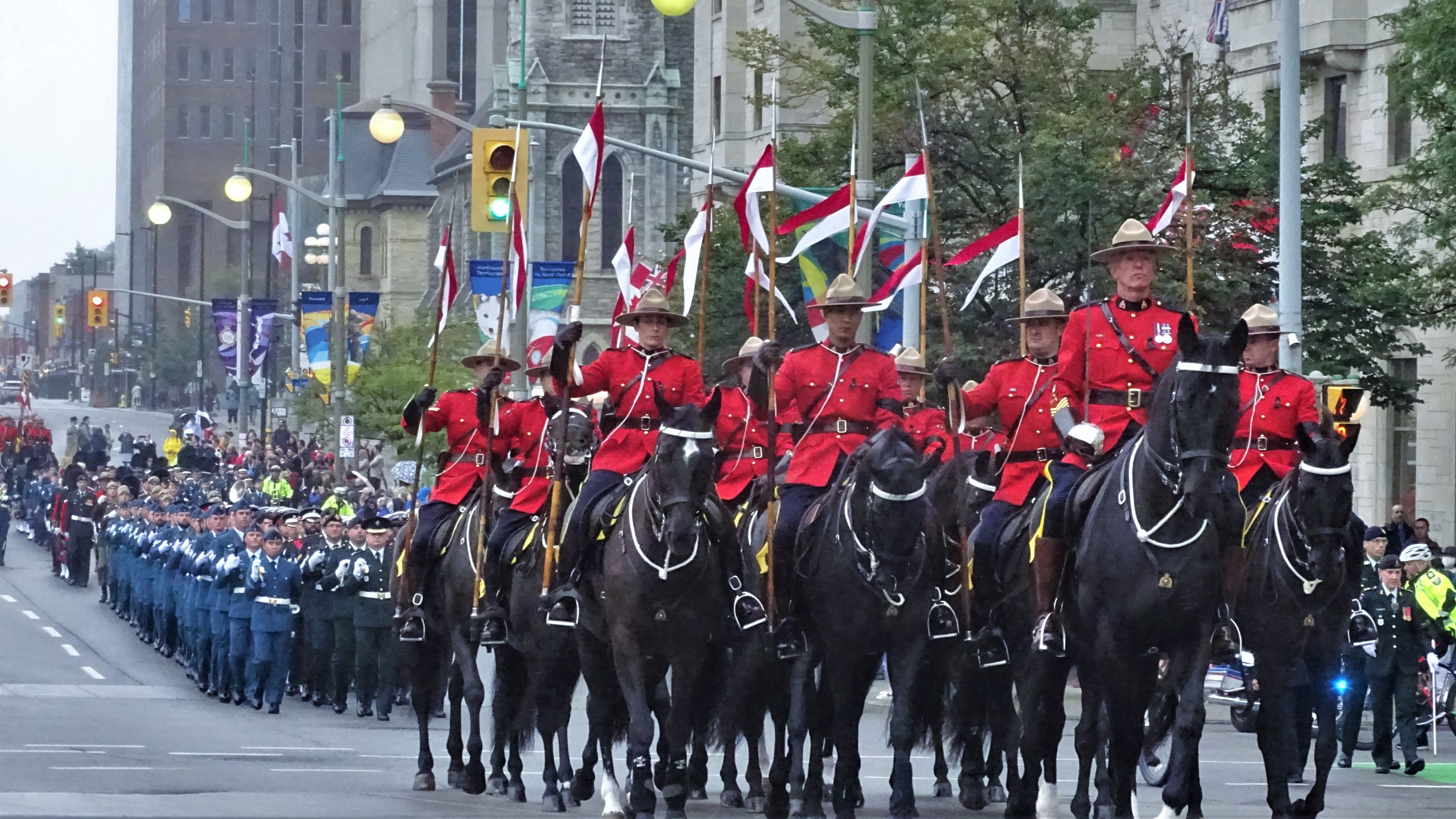
A memorial procession in Ottawa before the national commemoration ceremony for the death of Queen Elizabeth II

A period of mourning also follows, during which portraits of the recently deceased monarch are draped with black fabric and staff at government houses wear black armbands. The Manual of Official Procedure of the Government of Canada states the prime minister is responsible for convening Parliament, tabling a resolution of loyalty and condolence from Parliament to the new monarch, and arranging for the motion to be seconded by the leader of the official opposition. The prime minister will then move to adjourn Parliament. The Canadian Broadcasting Corporation keeps a regularly updated plan for a "broadcast of national importance", announcing the demise of a sovereign and covering the aftermath, during which all regular programming and advertising is cancelled and on-call commentators contribute to a 24-hour news mode. As funerals for Canada's sovereigns, as well as for their consorts, take place in the United Kingdom, commemoration services are conducted by the federal and provincial governments across Canada. Such ceremonies may also be held for other recently deceased members of the royal family. The day of the sovereign's funeral is likely to be a federal holiday.

The new monarch is crowned in the United Kingdom in an ancient ritual but one not necessary for a sovereign to reign. (Note: For example, Edward VIII was never crowned, yet was undoubtedly king during his short time on the throne.) Under the federal Interpretation Act, officials who hold a federal office under the Crown are not affected by the death of the monarch, nor are they required to take the Oath of Allegiance again. In some provinces, though, those holding Crown offices must swear the Oath to the new sovereign. All references in federal legislation to previous monarchs, whether in the masculine (e.g. His Majesty) or feminine (e.g. The Queen), continue to mean the reigning sovereign of Canada, regardless of their gender. This is because, in common law, the Crown never dies. After an individual accedes to the throne, he or she usually continues to reign until death. (Note: The only Canadian monarch to abdicate, Edward VIII, did so with the authorization of the Canadian government granted in His Majesty's Declaration of Abdication Act, 1936, and the Succession to the Throne Act, 1937, later confirmed this in law.)

==== Legal aspects of succession ====
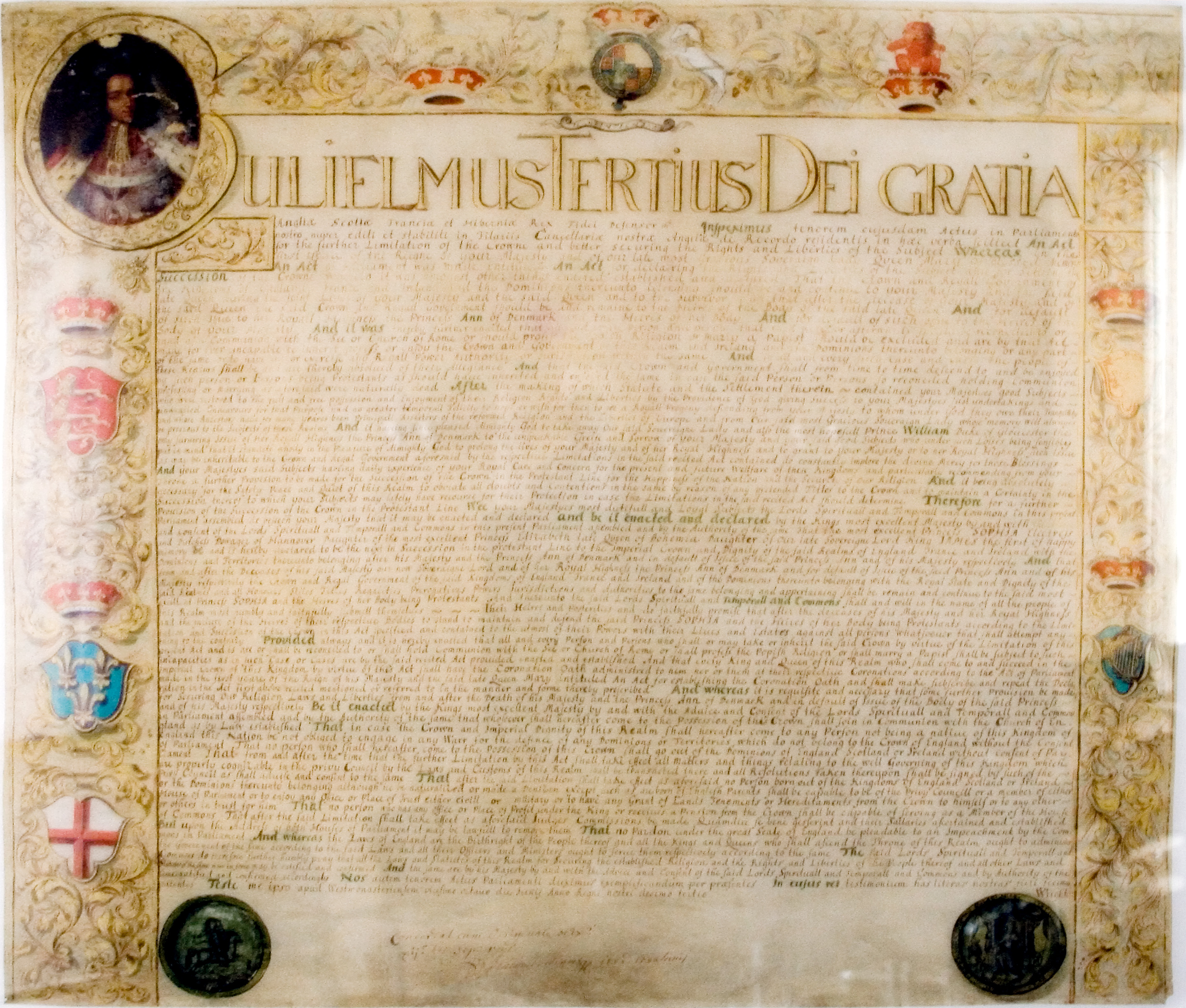
A copy of the Act of Settlement, 1701

The relationship between the Commonwealth realms is such that any change to the rules of succession to their respective crowns requires the unanimous consent of all the realms. Succession is governed by statutes, such as the Bill of Rights, 1689, the Act of Settlement, 1701, and the Acts of Union, 1707.

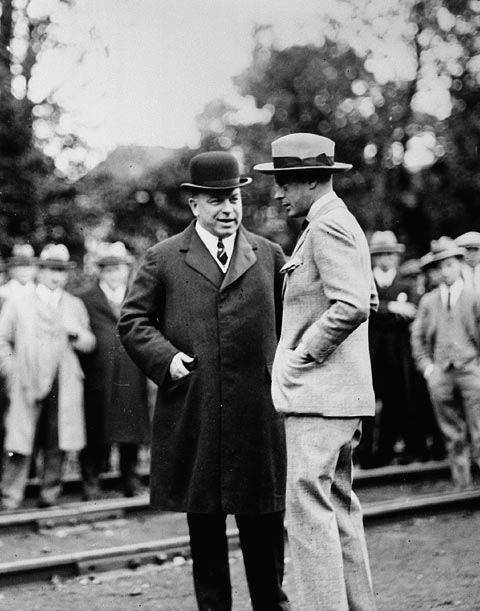
Prime Minister of Canada Mackenzie King (left) and Edward VIII (right; when Prince of Wales) in Ottawa, 1924. In 1936, Edward abdicated the Canadian throne and he and any of his descendants were removed from the line of succession by Order-in-Council PC 3144 and the Succession to the Throne Act, 1937.

Edward VIII abdicated in 1936, and any possible future descendants of his were excluded from the line of succession. The British government at the time, wishing for speed so as to avoid embarrassing debate in Dominion parliaments, suggested that the governments of the Dominions of the British Commonwealth—then Australia, New Zealand, the Irish Free State, the Union of South Africa, and Canada—regard whoever was monarch of the UK to automatically be monarch of their respective Dominion. As with the other Dominion governments, the Canadian Cabinet, headed by Prime Minister William Lyon Mackenzie King, refused to accept the idea and stressed that the laws of succession were part of Canadian law and, as the Statute of Westminster 1931 disallowed the UK from legislating for Canada, including in relation to succession, altering them required Canada's request and consent to the British legislation (His Majesty's Declaration of Abdication Act, 1936) becoming part of Canadian law. Sir Maurice Gwyer, first parliamentary counsel in the UK, reflected this position, stating the Act of Settlement was a part of the law in each Dominion. Thus, Order-in-Council P.C. 3144 was issued, expressing the Cabinet's request and consent for His Majesty's Declaration of Abdication Act, 1936, to become part of the laws of Canada and the Succession to the Throne Act, 1937, gave parliamentary ratification to that action, together bringing the Act of Settlement and Royal Marriages Act, 1772, into Canadian law. The latter was deemed by the Cabinet in 1947 to be part of Canadian law. (Note: Gary Toffoli of the Canadian Royal Heritage Trust stated that the approval given by the Queen in her Canadian Council in 1981 to the marriage of Charles, Prince of Wales, and Lady Diana Spencer separately to the same approval given by the Queen in her British Council illustrated the existence of the Royal Marriages Act in Canadian law. In 1947, the King in his Canadian Council gave the same consent to the marriage of Princess Elizabeth to Philip Mountbatten, again separate from the approval he gave in his British Council.) The Department of External Affairs included all succession-related laws in its list of acts within Canadian law.

The Supreme Court of Canada declared unanimously in the 1981 Patriation Reference that the Bill of Rights, 1689, is "undoubtedly in force as part of the law of Canada". Furthermore, in O'Donohue v. Canada (2003) the Ontario Superior Court of Justice found that the Act of Settlement, 1701, is "part of the laws of Canada" and the rules of succession are "by necessity incorporated into the Constitution of Canada". Another ruling of the Ontario Superior Court, in 2014, echoed the 2003 case, stating that the Act of Settlement "is an imperial statute which ultimately became part of the law of Canada." Upon dismissing appeal of that case, the Court of Appeal of Ontario stated "[t]he rules of succession are a part of the fabric of the constitution of Canada and incorporated into it".

In a meeting of the Special Joint Committee on the Constitution during the process of patriating the Canadian constitution in 1981, John Munro asked Minister of Justice Jean Chrétien about the "selective omissions" of the Succession to the Throne Act, 1937, the Demise of the Crown Act, 1901, the Seals Act, the Governor General's Act, and the Royal Style and Titles Act, 1953, from the schedule to the Constitution Act, 1982. In response, Chrétien asserted that the schedule to the Constitution Act, 1982, was not exhaustive, outlining that section 52(2) of the Constitution Act, 1982, says "[t]he Constitution of Canada includes [...] the acts and orders referred to the schedule" and "[w]hen you use the word 'includes' [...] it means that if ever there is another thing related to the Canadian constitution as part of it, should have been there, or might have been there, it is covered. So we do not have to renumerate [sic] the ones that you are mentioning." In the same meeting, Deputy Attorney General Barry Strayer stated: "Clause 52(2) is not an exhaustive definition of the Constitution of Canada so that while we have certain things listed in the schedule which are clearly part of the constitution, that does not mean that there are not other things which are part of the constitution [...] [The schedule] is not an exhaustive list."

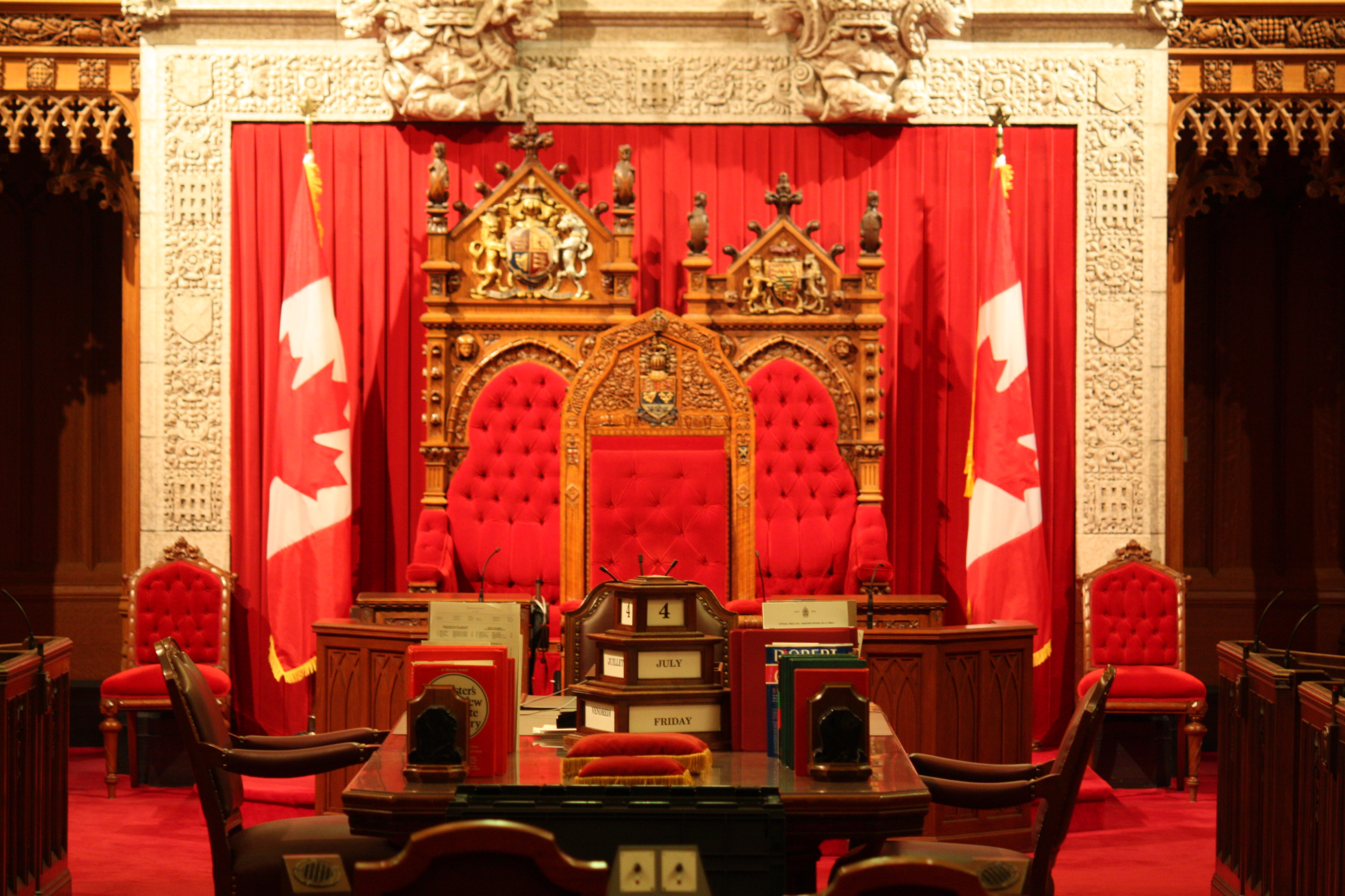
The throne of Canada (left) and throne for the royal consort (right)—both commissioned in 1878—behind the speaker's chair in the Senate

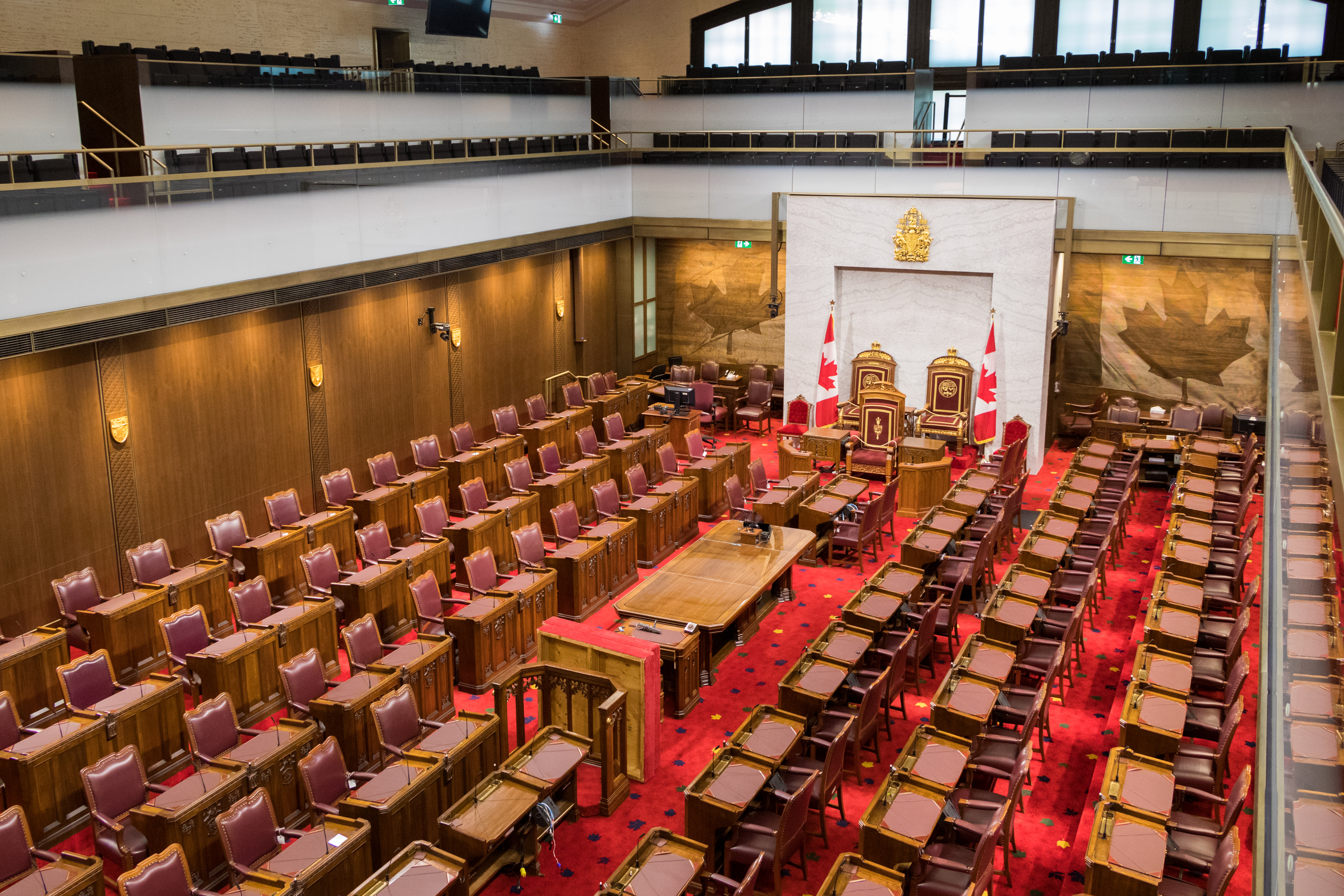
The sovereign's throne (left) and royal consort's throne (right) behind the speaker's chair—all made in 2017—in the temporary Senate chamber

Leslie Zines claimed in the 1991 publication, Constitutional Change in the Commonwealth, that, though the succession to Canada's throne was outlined by common law and the Act of Settlement, 1701, these were not part of the Canadian constitution, which "does not contain rules for succession to the throne." Richard Toporoski, writing three years later for the Monarchist League of Canada, stated, "there is no existing provision in our law, other than the Act of Settlement, 1701, that provides that the king or queen of Canada shall be the same person as the king or queen of the United Kingdom. If the British law were to be changed and we did not change our law [...] the person provided for in the new law would become king or queen in at least some realms of the Commonwealth; Canada would continue on with the person who would have become monarch under the previous law."

Canada, with the other Commonwealth realms, committed to the 2011 Perth Agreement, which proposed changes to the rules governing succession to remove male preference and removal of disqualification arising from marriage to a Roman Catholic. As a result, the Canadian Parliament passed the Succession to the Throne Act, 2013, which gave the country's assent to the Succession to the Crown Bill, at that time proceeding in the Parliament of the United Kingdom. In dismissing a challenge to the law on the basis that a change to the succession in Canada would require unanimous consent of all provinces under section 41(a) of the Constitution Act, 1982, Quebec Superior Court Justice Claude Bouchard ruled that Canada "did not have to change its laws nor its constitution for the British royal succession rules to be amended and effective" and constitutional convention committed Canada to having a line of succession symmetrical to those of other Commonwealth realms. The ruling was upheld by the Quebec Court of Appeal. The Supreme Court of Canada declined to hear an appeal in April 2020.

Constitutional scholar Philippe Lagassé argues that, in light of the Succession to the Throne Act, 2013, and court rulings upholding that law, section 41(a) of the Constitution Act, 1982, which requires a constitutional amendment passed with the unanimous consent of the provinces, applies only to the "office of the Queen", but not who holds that office, and that therefore "ending the principle of symmetry with the United Kingdom can be done with the general amending procedure, or even by Parliament alone under section 44 of the Constitution Act, 1982."

Ted McWhinney, another constitutional scholar, argued that a future government of Canada could begin a process of phasing out the monarchy after the death of Elizabeth II "quietly and without fanfare by simply failing legally to proclaim any successor to the Queen in relation to Canada". This would, he claimed, be a way of bypassing the need for a constitutional amendment that would require unanimous consent by the federal Parliament and all the provincial legislatures. However, Ian Holloway, Dean of Law at the University of Western Ontario, criticized McWhinney's proposal for its ignorance of provincial input and opined that its implementation "would be contrary to the plain purpose of those who framed our system of government."

Certain aspects of the succession rules have been challenged in the courts. For example, under the provisions of the Bill of Rights, 1689, and the Act of Settlement, 1701, Catholics are barred from succeeding to the throne; this prohibition has been upheld twice by Canadian courts, once in 2003 and again in 2014. Legal scholar Christopher Cornell of the SMU Dedman School of Law concluded "that the prohibition on the Canadian Monarch being Catholic, while discriminatory, is perfectly-if not fundamentally-constitutional" and that if the prohibition is "to be changed or removed it will have to be accomplished politically and legislatively through another multilateral agreement similar to the Perth Agreement rather than judicially through the courts."

==== Regency ====
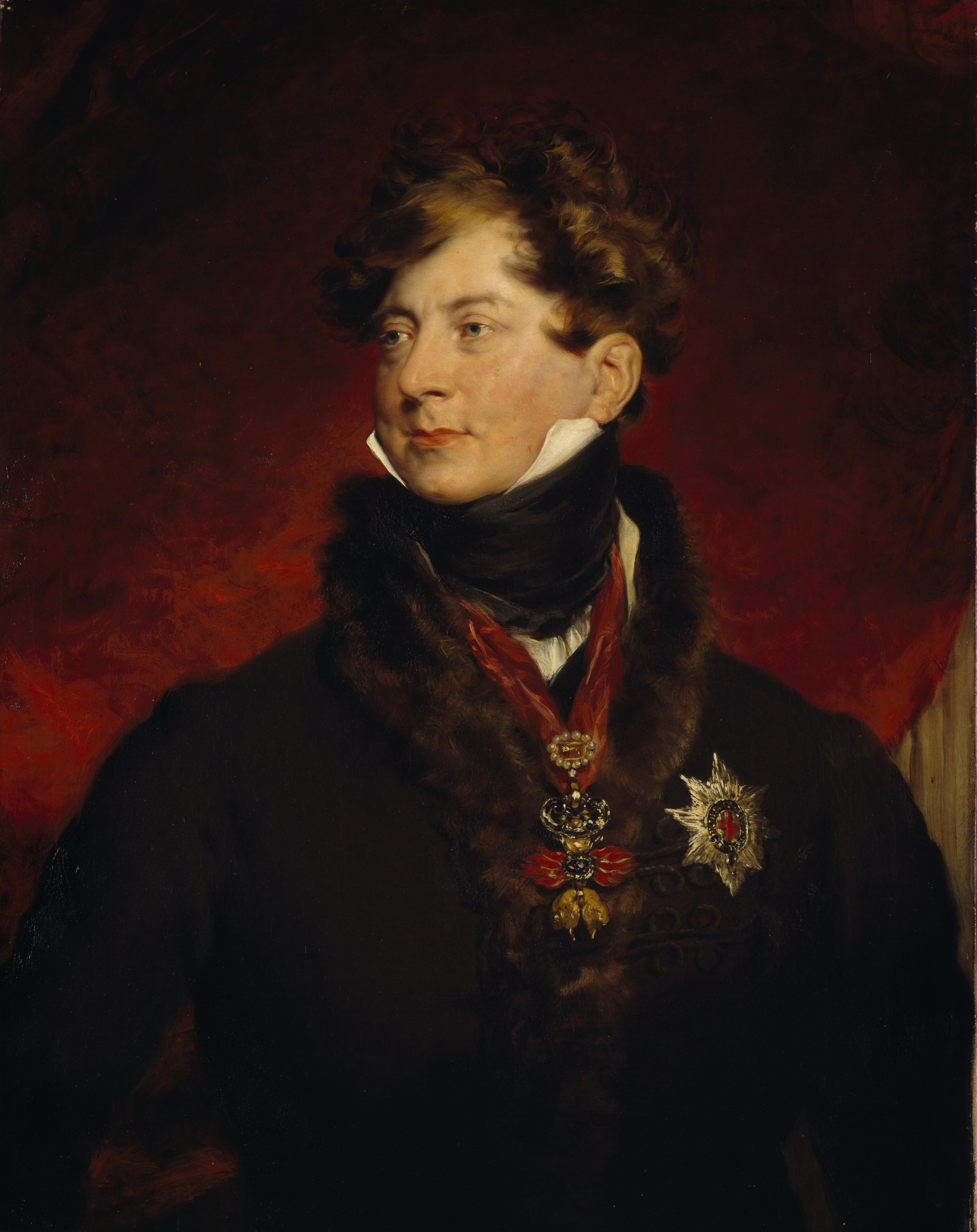
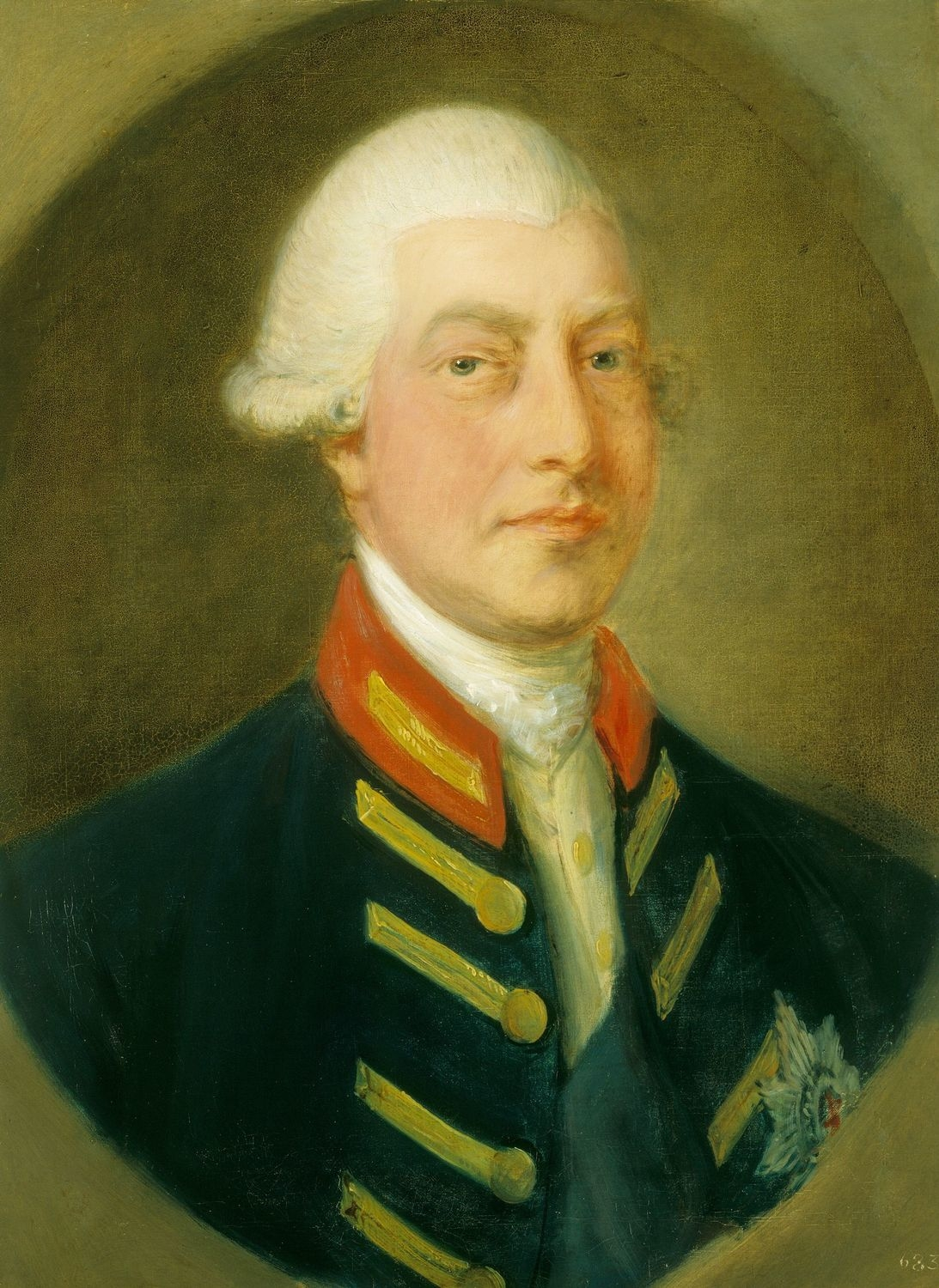
Prince George, Prince Regent (left), Canada's last regent, serving as such from 1811 until the death of his father, George III (right), in 1820

Canada has no laws allowing for a regency, should the sovereign be a minor or debilitated; none have been passed by the Canadian Parliament and it was made clear by successive cabinets since 1937 that the United Kingdom's Regency Act had no applicability to Canada, as the Canadian Cabinet had not requested otherwise when the act was passed that year and again in 1943 and 1953. As the Letters Patent, 1947, issued by King George VI permit the governor general of Canada to exercise almost all of the monarch's powers in respect of Canada, the viceroy is expected to continue to act as the personal representative of the monarch, and not any regent, even if the monarch is a child or incapacitated.

This has led to the question of whether the governor general has the ability to remove themselves and appoint their viceregal successor in the monarch's name. While Lagassé argued that appears to be the case, both the Canadian Manual of Official Procedures, published in 1968, and the Privy Council Office took the opposite opinion. Lagassé and Patrick Baud claimed changes could be made to regulations to allow a governor general to appoint the next governor general; Christopher McCreery, however, criticized the theory, arguing it is impractical to suggest that a governor general would remove him or herself on ministerial advice, with the consequence that, if a prolonged regency occurred, it would remove one of the checks and balances in the constitution. The intent expressed whenever the matter of regency came up among Commonwealth realm heads of government was that the relevant parliament (other than the United Kingdom's) would pass a bill if the need for a regency arose and the pertinent governor-general would already be empowered to grant royal assent to it. The governor general appointing their successor is not a power that has been utilized to date.

=== Foreign visits ===
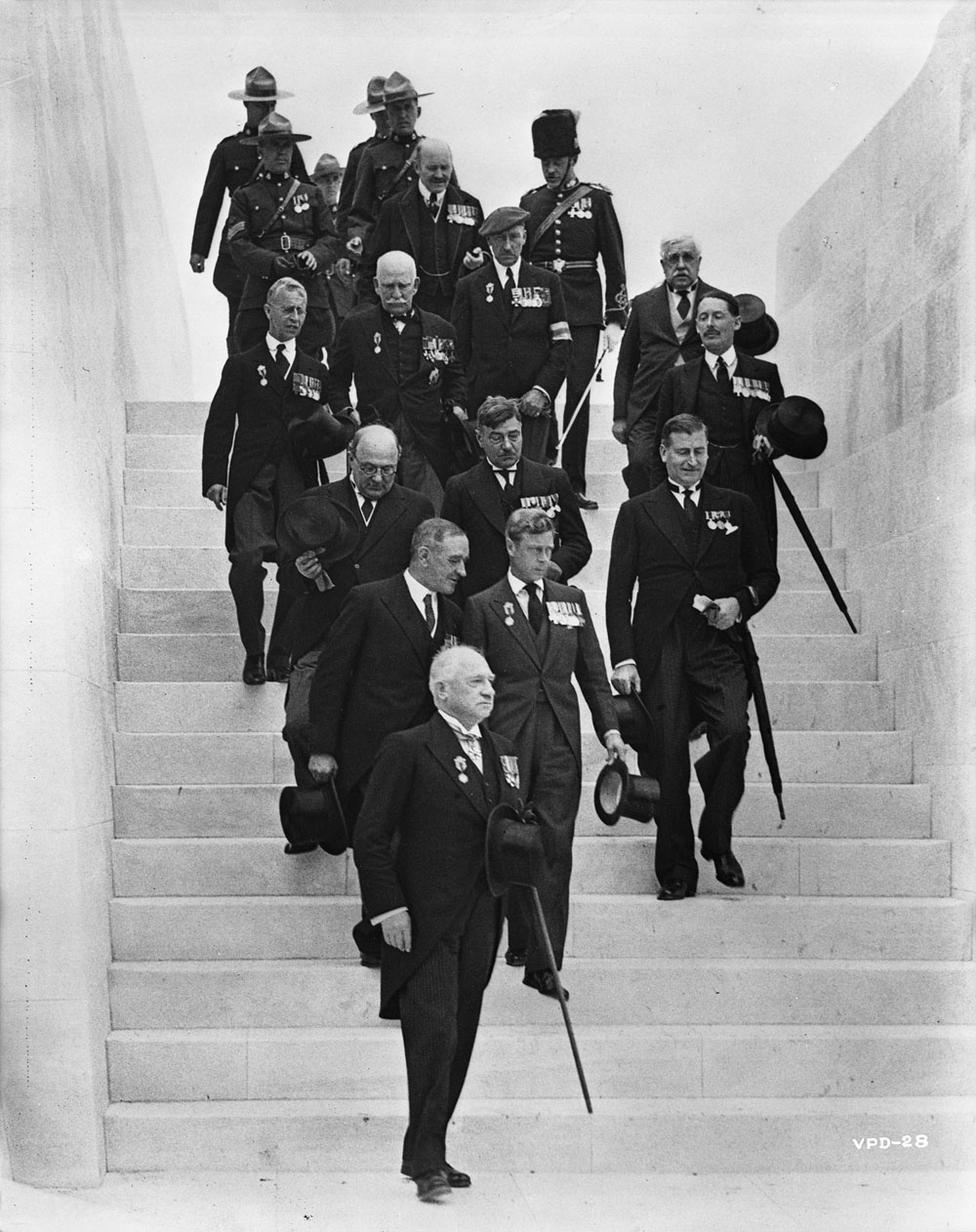
King Edward VIII in Vimy, France, 1936

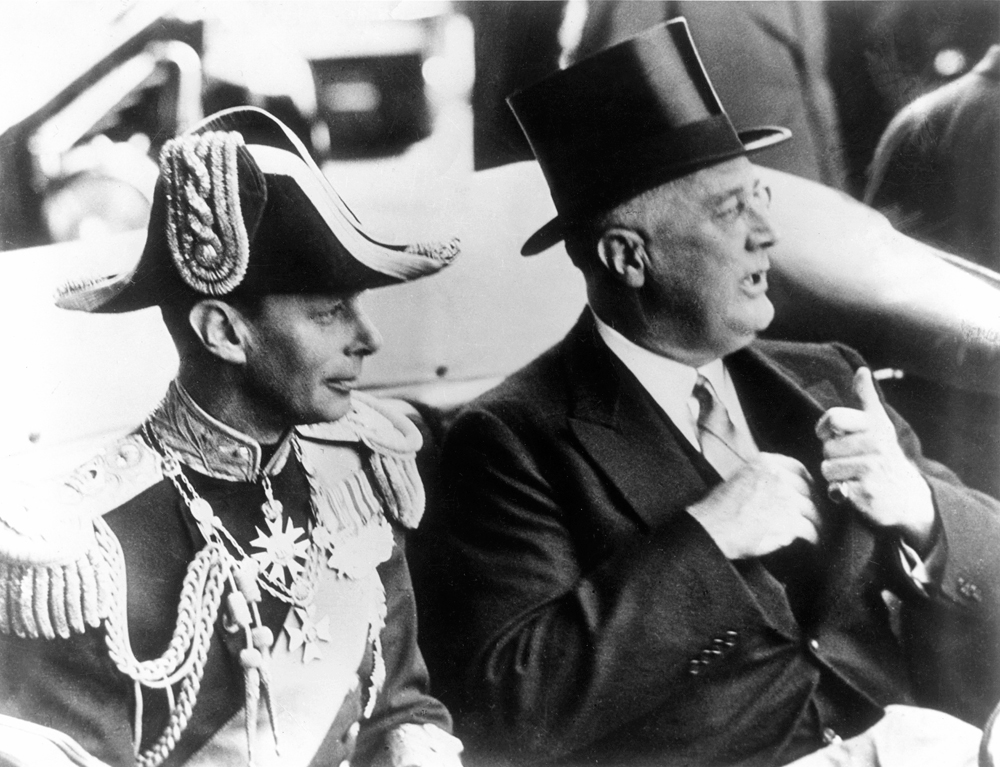
King George VI in Washington, United States, 1939

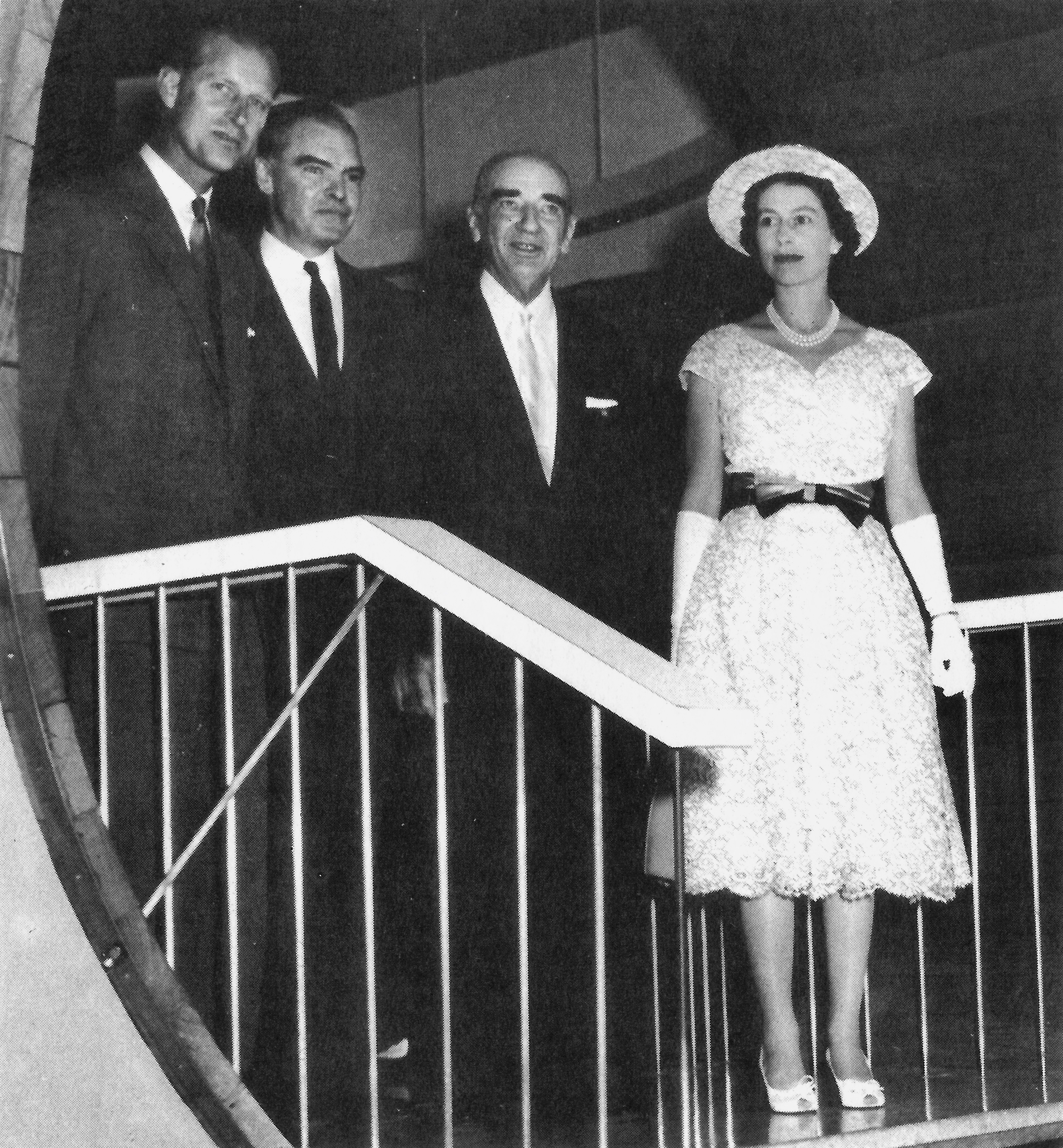
Queen Elizabeth II in Chicago, United States, 1959

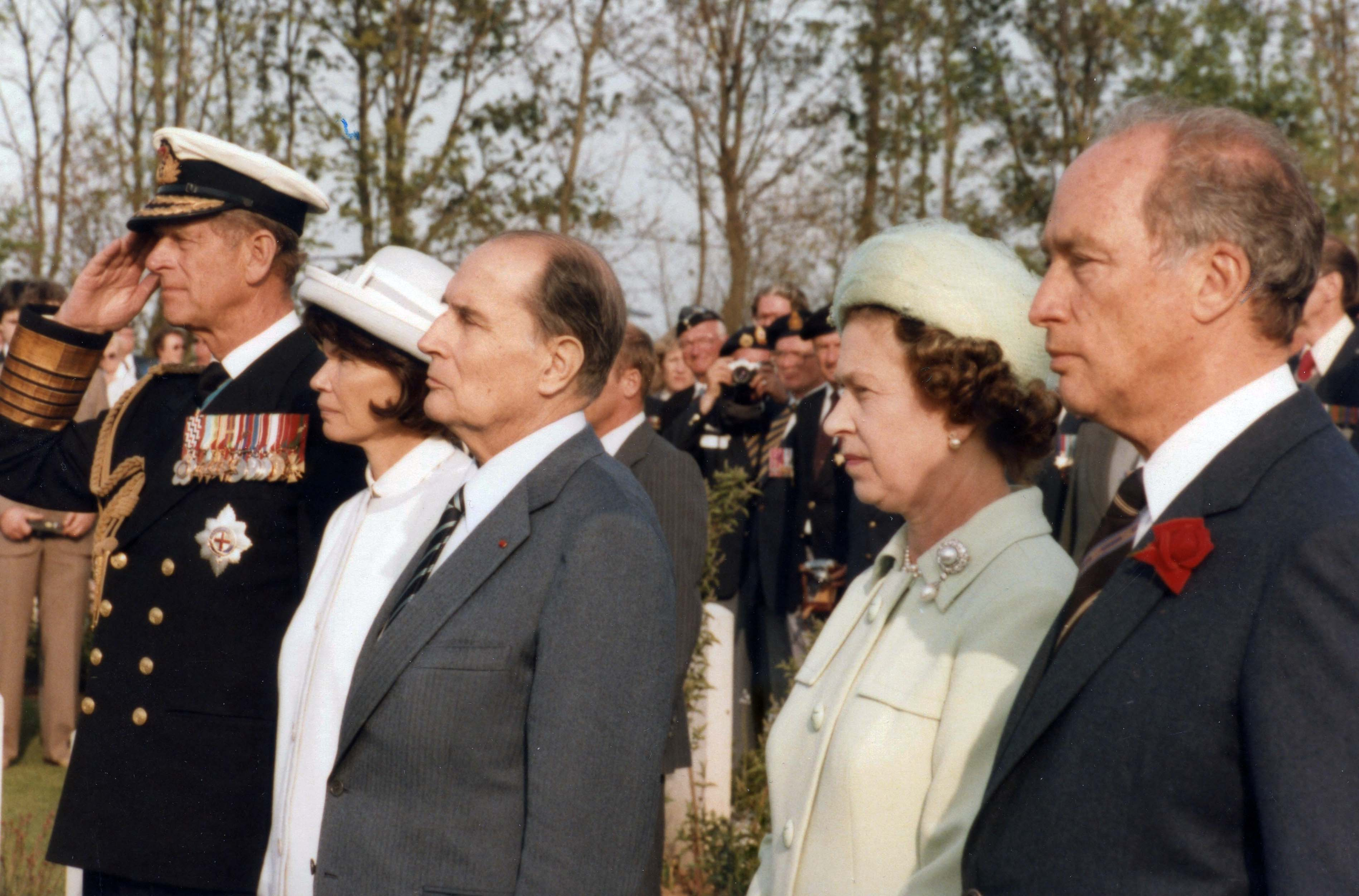
Queen Elizabeth II in Beny-sur-Mer, France, 1984

The following state and official visits to foreign countries have been made by the monarch as the sovereign of Canada (sometimes representing other realms on the same visit):

Visit to	Date	Monarch of Canada	Received by	Type
France	26 July 1936	King Edward VIII	President Albert Lebrun	Official
United States	7–11 June 1939	King George VI	President Franklin D. Roosevelt	State
United States	17 October 1957	Queen Elizabeth II	President Dwight D. Eisenhower	State
United States	26 June 1959	Queen Elizabeth II	President Dwight D. Eisenhower	Official
United States	6 July 1959	Queen Elizabeth II	Governor William Stratton	State
France	6 June 1984	Queen Elizabeth II	President François Mitterrand	Official
France	1994	Queen Elizabeth II	President François Mitterrand	Official
France	6 June 2004	Queen Elizabeth II	President Jacques Chirac	Official
France	9 April 2007	Queen Elizabeth II	Prime Minister Dominique de Villepin	Official
United States	6 July 2010	Queen Elizabeth II	Governor David Paterson	Official

== Federal and provincial aspects ==
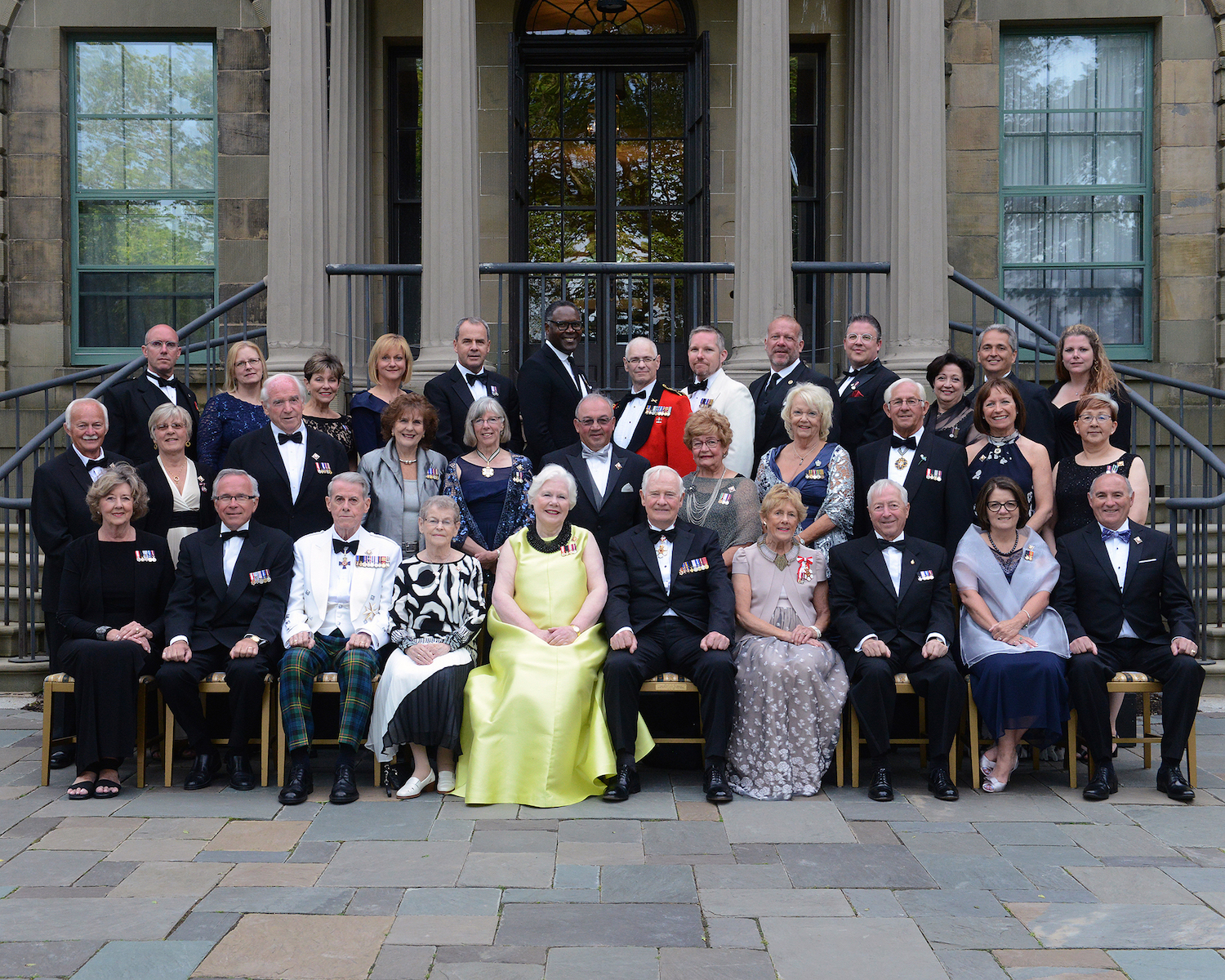
The one federal and 10 provincial viceroys, along with the three territorial commissioners, at their annual meeting in 2016, accompanied by their respective partners and secretaries

The origins of Canadian sovereignty lie in the early 17th century, during which time the monarch in England fought with parliament there over who had ultimate authority, culminating in the Glorious Revolution in 1688 and the subsequent Bill of Rights, 1689, which, as mentioned elsewhere in this article, is today part of Canadian constitutional law. This brought to Canada the British notion of the supremacy of parliament—of which the monarch is a part—and it was carried into each of the provinces upon the implementation of responsible government. That, however, was superseded when the Charter of Rights and Freedoms (within the Constitution Act, 1982) introduced into Canada the American idea of the supremacy of the law. Still, the King remains the sovereign of Canada. (Note: Upon acceding to the throne on 8 September 2022, King Charles III stated, "I am deeply aware of this great inheritance and of the duties and heavy responsibilities of sovereignty, which have now passed to me. In taking up these responsibilities, I shall strive to follow the inspiring example I have been set in upholding constitutional government and to seek the peace, harmony, and prosperity of [...] the Commonwealth realms and territories throughout the world.")

Canada's monarchy was established at Confederation, when its executive government and authority were declared, in section 9 of the Constitution Act, 1867, to continue and be vested in the monarch. Placing such power, along with legislative power, with the tangible, living Queen, rather than the abstract and inanimate Crown, was a deliberate choice by the framers of the constitution. Still, the Crown is the foundation of the country as "the very centre of [Canada's] constitution and democracy." Although Canada is a federation, the Canadian monarchy is unitary throughout all jurisdictions in the country, the sovereignty of the different administrations being passed on through the overreaching Crown itself as a part of the executive, legislative, and judicial operations in each of the federal and provincial spheres and the headship of state being a part of all equally. The Crown thus links the various governments into a federal state, while it is simultaneously also "divided" into 11 legal jurisdictions, or 11 "crowns"—one federal and 10 provincial—with the monarch taking on a distinct legal persona in each. (Note: For example, if a lawsuit is filed against the federal government, the respondent is formally described as His Majesty the King in Right of Canada, or simply Rex. Likewise, in a case in which a party sues both the province of Saskatchewan and the federal government, the respondents would be formally called His Majesty the King in Right of Saskatchewan and His Majesty the King in Right of Canada.) (Note: Illustrative of this arrangement is property transfers; of this, the Ontario Ministry of Natural Resources states: "When public land is required by the federal government or one of its departments, or any provincial ministry, the land itself is not transferred. What is transferred is the responsibility to manage the lands on behalf of Her Majesty the Queen (HMQ). This is accomplished by an order-in-council or a minister's order, which transfers management of land either from HMQ in right of Ontario to HMQ in right of Canada as represented by a department or to HMQ in right of Ontario as represented by another ministry. The Crown does not transfer ownership to itself.") As such, the constitution instructs that any change to the position of the monarch or their representatives in Canada requires the consent of the Senate, the House of Commons, and the legislative assemblies of all the provinces. This is the unanimous consent amending formula set out in section 41 of the Constitution Act, 1982, the most stringent of Canada's constitutional amending formulas. No amendment requiring unanimity has been successful since its adoption. The Crown, being shared and balanced, provides the bedrock upon which all of Canada's different regions and peoples can live together peacefully and was said by David E. Smith, in 2017, to be the "keystone of the constitutional architecture" of Canada.

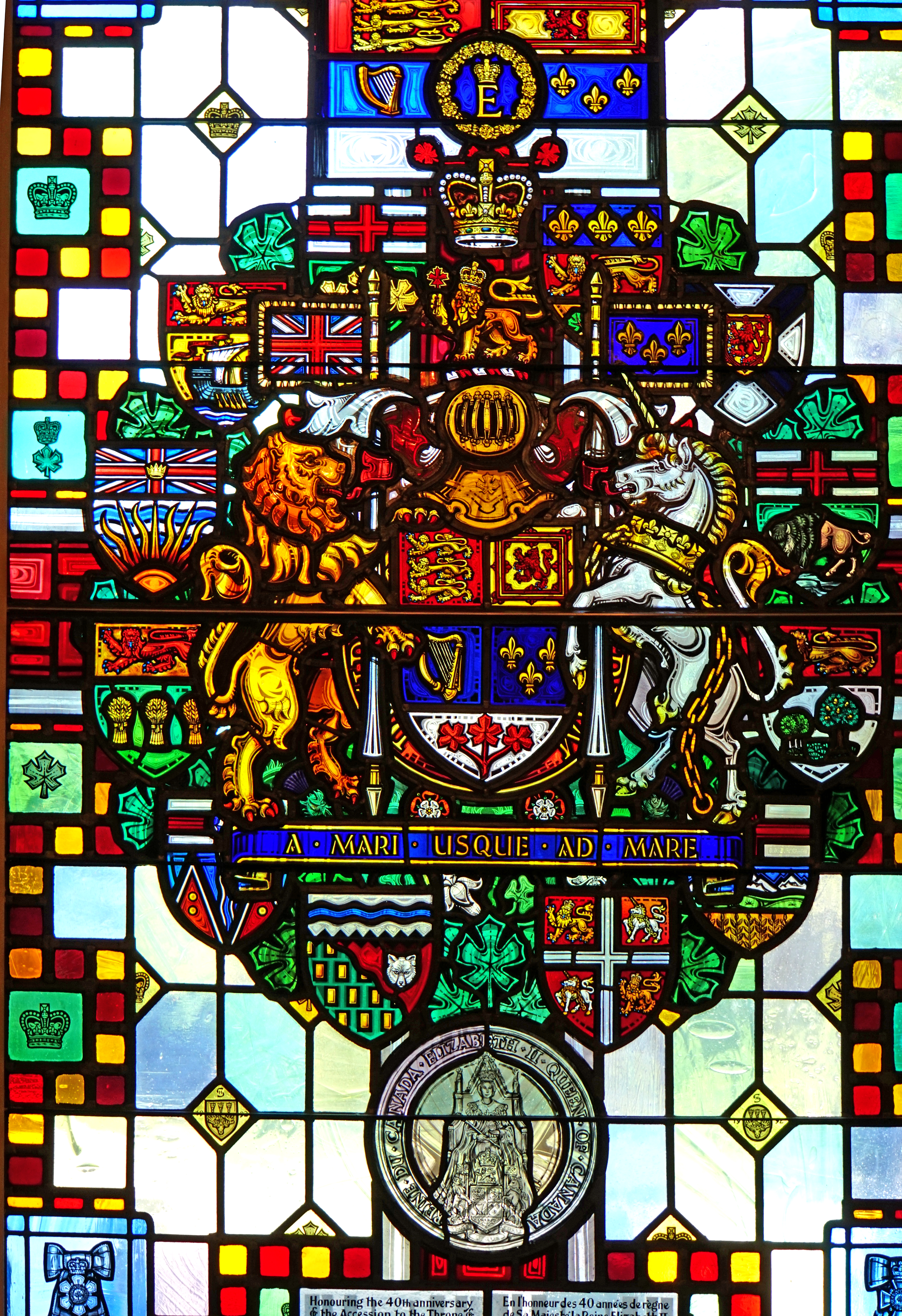
The Royal Window in the foyer of Rideau Hall, commemorating Queen Elizabeth II's Ruby Jubilee. At centre is the Royal Coat of Arms of Canada surrounded by the shields of each of the sovereign's provincial and territorial coats of arms.

The Crown is located beyond politics, existing to give authority to and protect the constitution and system of governance. Power, therefore, rests with an institution that "functions to safeguard it on behalf of all its citizens", rather than any singular individual. The sovereign and his representatives typically "act by 'not acting'" (Note: Robert E. Hawkins called this "inefficient efficiency", which can "be placed alongside the other oxymorons that convention embeds in our constitution, oxymorons like loyal opposition, liberal democracy, and constitutional monarchy itself.")—holding power, but, not exercising it—both because they are unelected figures and to maintain their neutrality, "deliberately, insistently, and resolutely", in case they have to be an impartial arbiter in a constitutional crisis and ensure that normal democratic discourse can resume. Consequently, the Crown performs two functions: as a unifying symbol and a protector of democratic rights and freedoms, "tightly woven into the fabric of the Canadian constitution."

At the same time, a number of freedoms granted by the constitution to all other Canadians are denied to, or limited for, the monarch and the other senior members of the royal family: freedom of religion, freedom of expression, freedom to travel, freedom to choose a career, freedom to marry, and freedom of privacy and family life.

While the Crown is empowered by statute and the royal prerogative, it also enjoys inherent powers not granted by either. The Court of Appeal of British Columbia ruled in 1997 that "the Crown has the capacities and powers of a natural person" and its actions as a natural person are, as with the actions of any natural person, subject to judicial review. Further, it was determined in R. v Secretary of State for Health the ex parte C that, "as a matter of capacity, no doubt, [the Crown] has power to do whatever a private person can do. But, as an organ of government, it can only exercise those powers for the public benefit, and for identifiably 'governmental' purposes within limits set by the law." Similarly, use of the royal prerogative is justiciable, though, only when the "subject matter affects the rights or legitimate expectations of an individual".

The governor general is appointed by the monarch on the advice of his federal prime minister and the lieutenant governors are appointed by the governor general on the advice of the federal prime minister. The commissioners of Canada's territories are appointed by the federal governor-in-council, at the recommendation of the minister of Crown–Indigenous relations, but, as the territories are not sovereign entities, the commissioners are not personal representatives of the sovereign. The Advisory Committee on Vice-Regal Appointments, which may seek input from the relevant premier and provincial or territorial community, proposes candidates for appointment as governor general, lieutenant governor, and commissioner.

=== Sovereign immunity ===
It has been held since 1918 that the federal Crown is immune from provincial law. Constitutional convention has also held that the Crown in right of each province is outside the jurisdiction of the courts in other provinces. This view, however, has been questioned.

Lieutenant governors do not enjoy the same immunity as the sovereign in matters not relating to the powers of the viceregal office, as decided in the case of former Lieutenant Governor of Quebec Lise Thibault, who had been accused of misappropriating public funds.

== Personification of the Canadian state ==
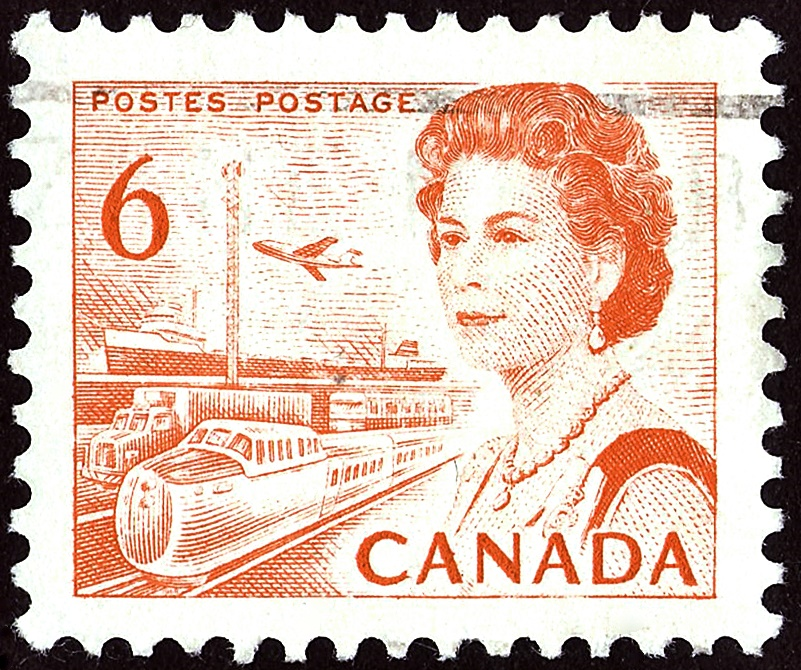
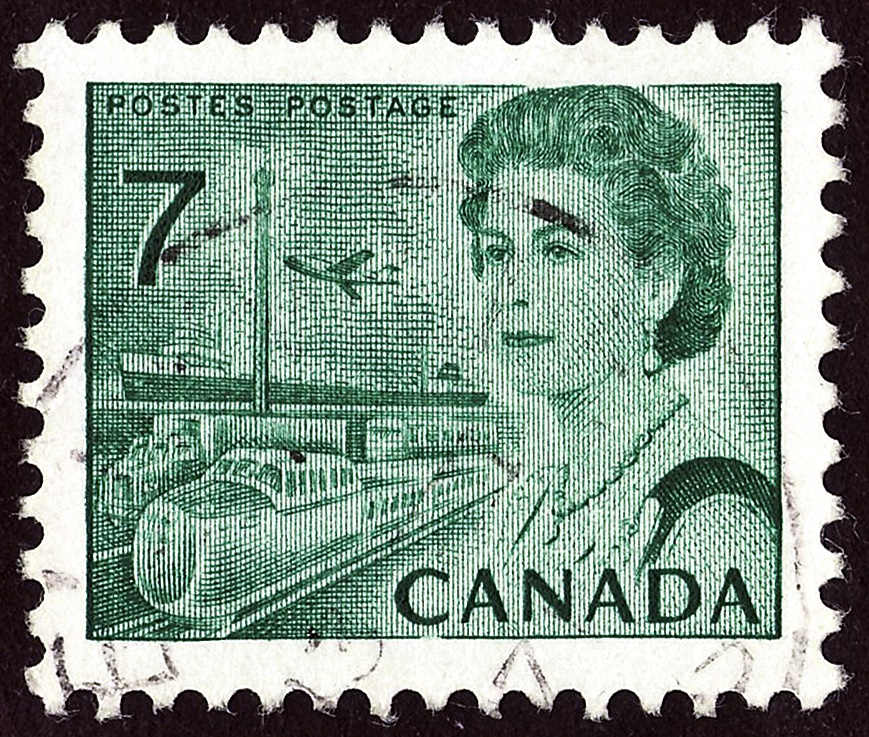
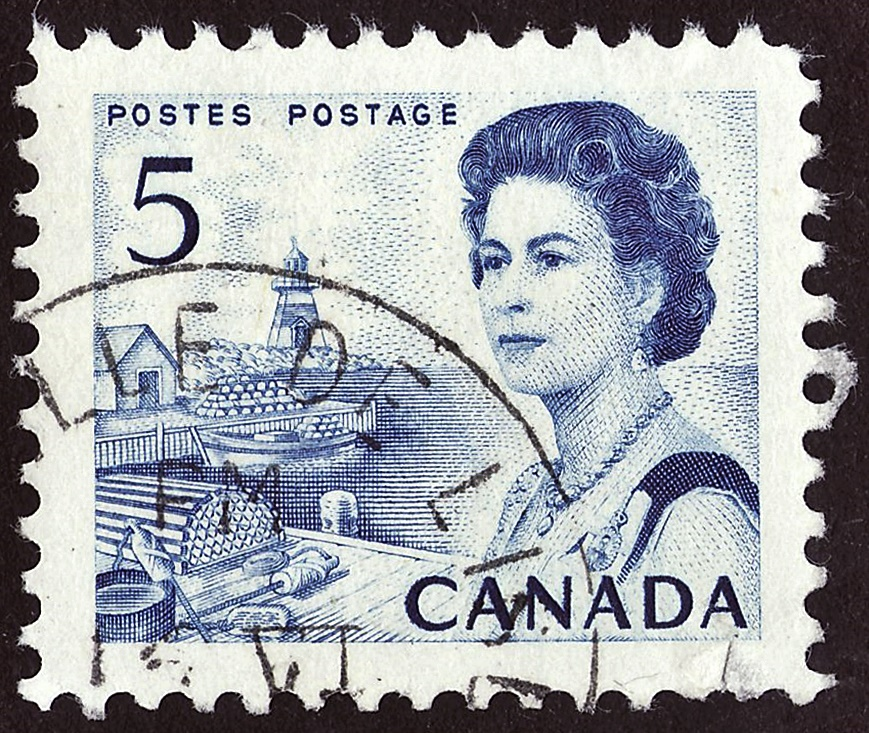
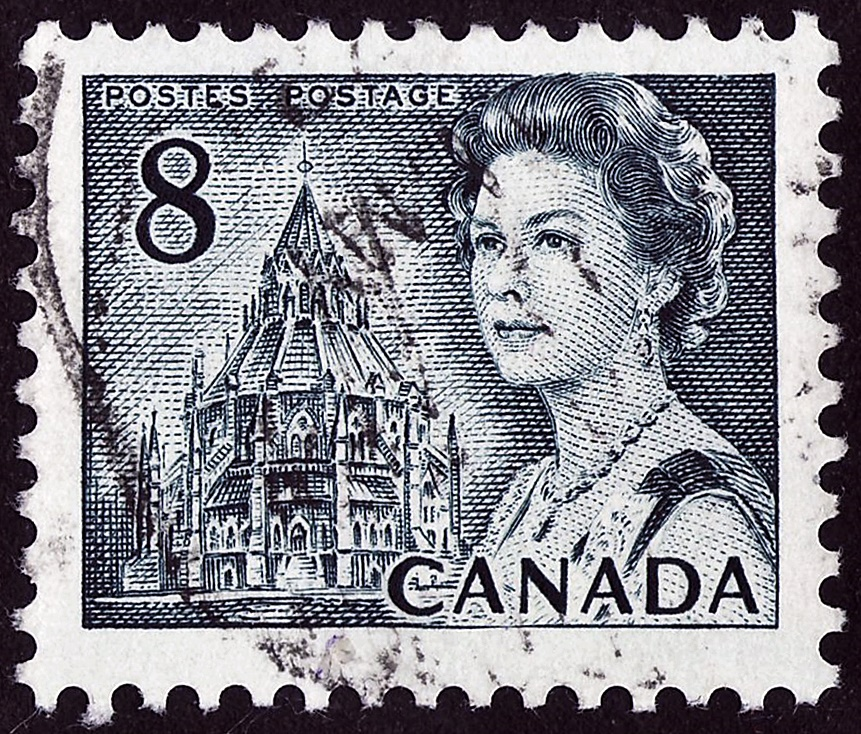
Elizabeth II, Queen of Canada, depicted on various Canadian stamps through the 1960s and 1970s

As the living embodiment of the Crown, the sovereign is regarded as the personification of the Canadian state (Note: The sovereign has been described by Eugene Forsey as the "symbolic embodiment of the people—not a particular group or interest or party, but the people, the whole people"; his daughter, Helen Forsey, said of his opinion on the Crown, "for him, the essence of the monarchy was its impartial representation of the common interests of the citizenry as a whole, as opposed to those of any particular government." The Department of Canadian Heritage said the Crown serves as the "personal symbol of allegiance, unity and authority for all Canadians," a concept akin to that expressed by King Louis XIV: "l'État, c'est moi", or, "I am the state". Robertson Davies stated in 1994, "the Crown is the consecrated spirit of Canada", and past Ontario chairman of the Monarchist League of Canada Gary Toffoli opined, "the Queen is the legal embodiment of the state at both the national and the provincial levels [...] She is our sovereign and it is the role of the Queen, recognized by the constitutional law of Canada, to embody the state.") and is meant to represent all Canadians, regardless of political affiliation. As such, he, along with their viceregal representatives, must "remain strictly neutral in political terms".

The person of the reigning sovereign thus holds two distinct personas in constant coexistence, an ancient theory of the "King's two bodies"—the body natural (subject to infirmity and death) and the body politic (which never dies). The Crown and the monarch are "conceptually divisible but legally indivisible [...] The office cannot exist without the office-holder", (Note: As Peter Boyce put it: "The Crown as a concept cannot be disentangled from the person of the monarch; but, standard reference to the Crown extends well beyond the Queen's person.") so, even in private, the monarch is always "on duty". The terms the state, the Crown, the Crown in Right of Canada, His Majesty the King in Right of Canada (French: Sa Majesté le Roi du chef du Canada), and similar are all synonymous and the monarch's legal personality is sometimes referred to simply as Canada.

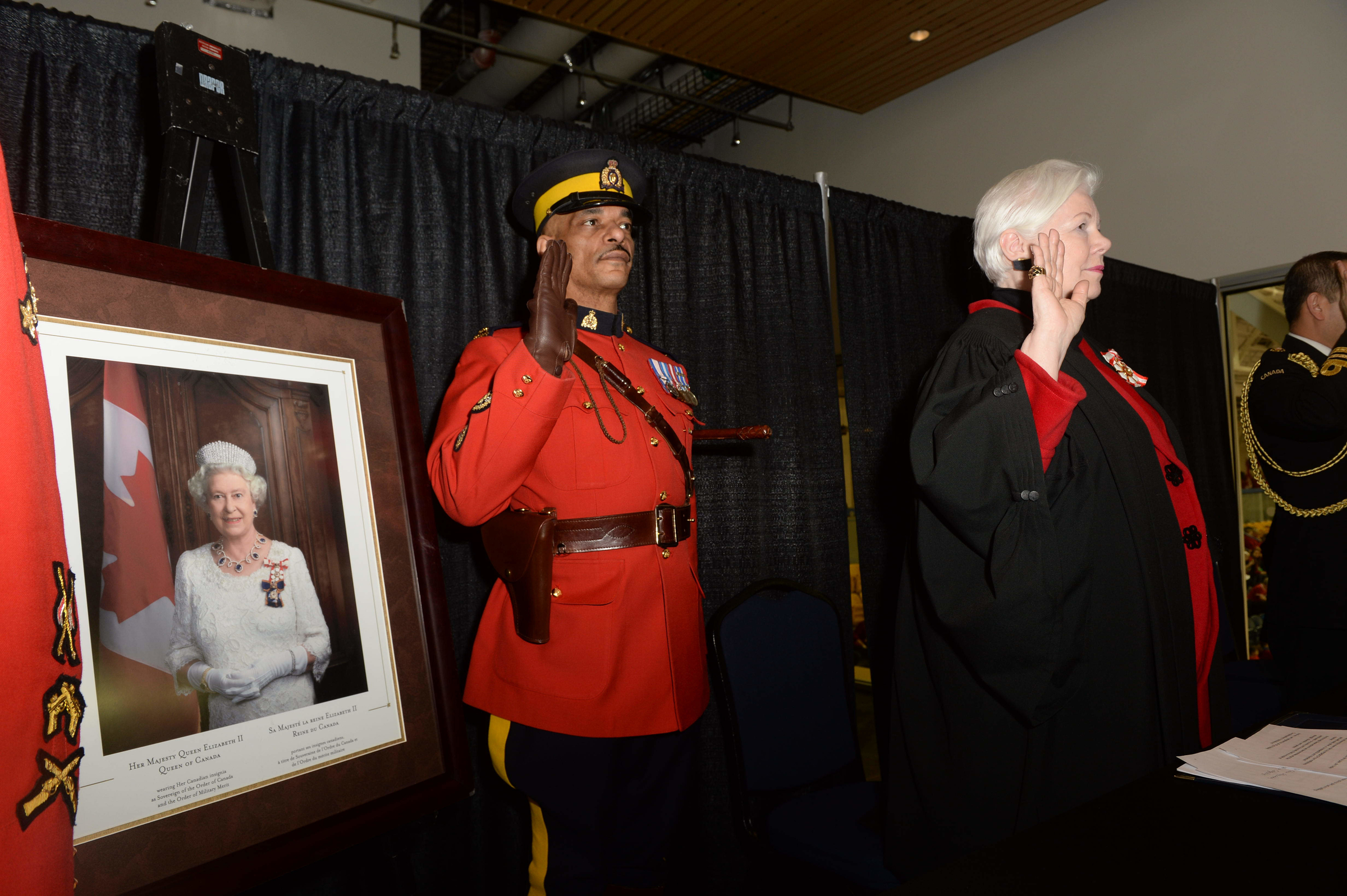
A photo portrait of Queen Elizabeth II stands at the front of a citizenship ceremony led by Lieutenant Governor of Ontario Elizabeth Dowdeswell, illustrating the sovereign as the focus of the Oath of Citizenship

The monarch is at the apex of the Canadian order of precedence and, as the embodiment of the state, is also the focus of oaths of allegiance, (Note: It is stated in the Rules & Forms of the House of Commons of Canada that, "allegiance to the King means allegiance to the country.") required of many of the aforementioned employees of the Crown, as well as by new citizens, as by the Oath of Citizenship. Allegiance is given in reciprocation to the sovereign's Coronation Oath, wherein he or she promises to govern the people of Canada "according to their respective laws and customs".

=== Head of state ===
Although it has been argued that the term head of state is a republican one inapplicable in a constitutional monarchy such as Canada, where the monarch is the embodiment of the state and thus cannot be head of it, the sovereign is regarded by official government sources, judges, constitutional scholars, and pollsters as the head of state, while the governor general and lieutenant governors are all only representatives of, and thus equally subordinate to, that figure. Some governors general, their staff, government publications, and constitutional scholars like Ted McWhinney and C.E.S. Franks have, however, referred to the position of governor general as that of Canada's head of state; though, sometimes qualifying the assertion with de facto or effective; Franks has hence recommended that the governor general be named officially as the head of state. Still others view the role of head of state as being shared by both the sovereign and his viceroys. Since 1927, governors general have been received on state visits abroad as though they were heads of state.

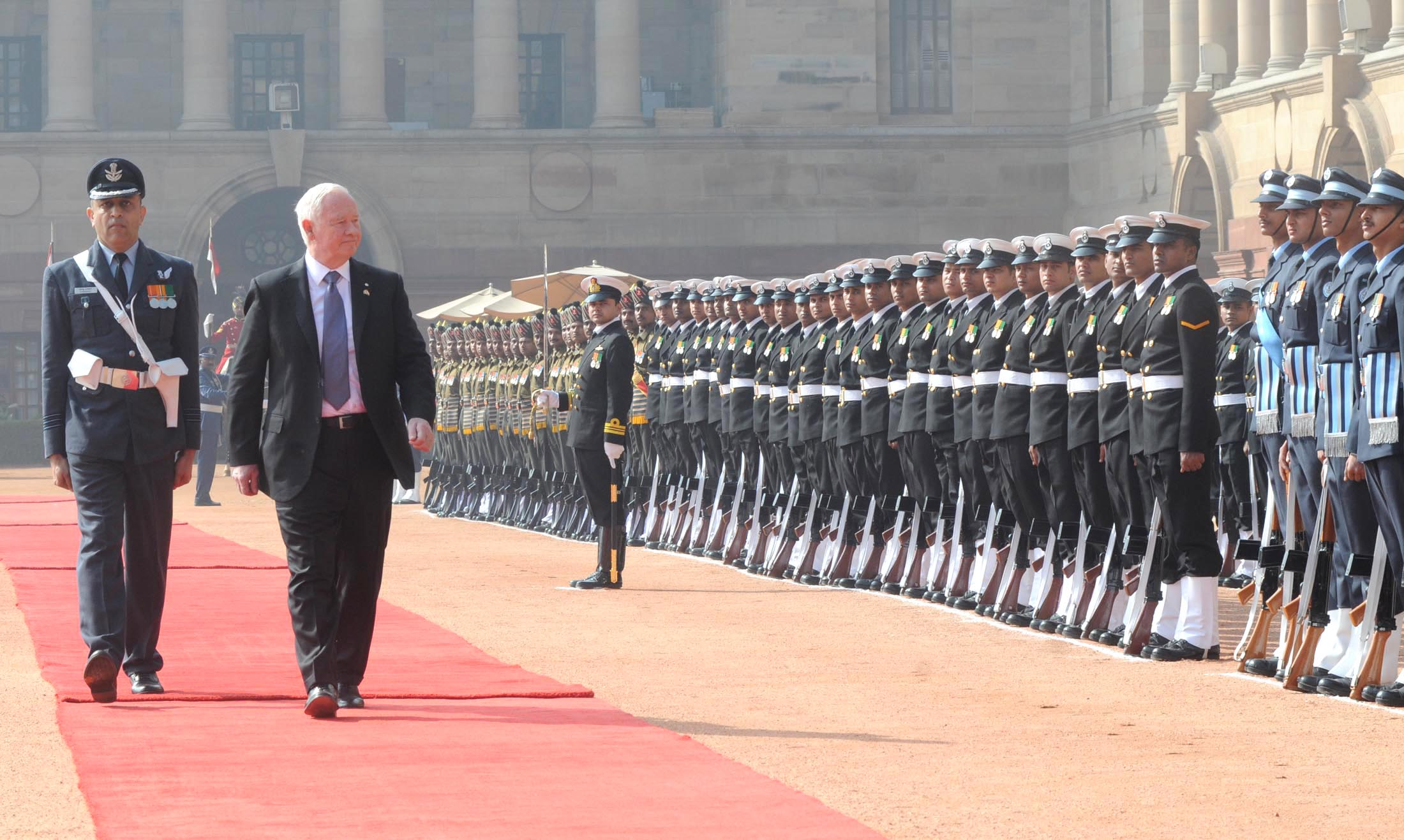
Governor General David Johnston reviews the guard of honour at Rashtrapati Bhavan during a state visit to India, 24 February 2014

Officials at Rideau Hall have attempted to use the Letters Patent, 1947, as justification for describing the governor general as head of state. However, the document makes no such distinction, nor does it amount to an abdication of the sovereign's powers in favour of the viceroy, as it only allows the governor general to "act on the Queen's behalf". D. Michael Jackson, former Chief of Protocol of Saskatchewan, argued that Rideau Hall had been attempting to "recast" the governor general as head of state since the 1970s and doing so preempted both the Queen and all of the lieutenant governors. This caused not only "precedence wars" at provincial events (where the governor general usurped the lieutenant governor's proper spot as most senior official in attendance) and Governor General Adrienne Clarkson to accord herself precedence before the Queen at a national occasion, but also constitutional issues by "unbalancing [...] the federalist symmetry". This has been regarded as both a natural evolution and as a dishonest effort to alter the constitution without public scrutiny.

In a poll conducted by Ipsos-Reid following the first prorogation of the 40th parliament on 4 December 2008, it was found that 42% of the sample group thought the prime minister was head of state, while 33% felt it was the governor general. Only 24% named the Queen as head of state, a number up from 2002, when the results of an EKOS Research Associates survey showed only 5% of those polled knew the Queen was head of state (69% answered that it was the prime minister).

=== Arms ===
The Sovereign's Flag for Canada employing the shield of the royal arms in banner form

The official coat of arms of Canada is the arms of dominion of the Canadian monarch and a symbol of national sovereignty. It is closely modelled after the royal coat of arms of the United Kingdom, with French and distinctive Canadian elements replacing or added to those derived from the British version, which was employed in Canada before the granting of the Canadian arms in 1921.

The Sovereign's Flag for Canada is the monarch's official flag, which depicts the royal arms in banner form. It takes precedence above all other flags in Canada—including the national flag and those of the other members of the royal family—and is typically flown from buildings, vessels, and vehicles in which the sovereign is present (although exceptions have been made for its use when the monarch is not in attendance). The sovereign's flag is never flown at half-mast because there is always a sovereign: when one dies, their successor becomes the sovereign instantly. Elements of the royal arms have also been incorporated into the governor general's flag; similarly, the flags of the lieutenant governors employ the shields of the relevant provincial coat of arms.

== Federal constitutional role ==
The function of constitutional monarchy is to personify the democratic state, to sanction legitimate authority, to assure the legality of its measures, and guarantee the execution of the public will. It is my ardent desire that no citizen in my realms should suffer restraint.

— Queen Elizabeth II, 1964, in her address to the National Assembly of Quebec

Canada's constitution is based on the Westminster parliamentary model, wherein the role of the King is both legal and practical, but not political. The sovereign is vested with all the powers of state, collectively known as the royal prerogative, leading the populace to be considered subjects of the Crown. However, as the sovereign's power stems from the people and the monarch is a constitutional one, he or she does not rule alone, as in an absolute monarchy. Instead, the Crown is regarded as a corporation sole, with the monarch being the centre of a construct in which the power of the whole is shared by multiple institutions of government—the executive, legislative, and judicial—acting under the sovereign's authority, which is entrusted for exercise by the politicians (the elected and appointed parliamentarians and the ministers of the Crown generally drawn from among them) and the judges and justices of the peace. The monarchy has thus been described as the underlying principle of Canada's institutional unity and the monarch as a "guardian of constitutional freedoms" whose "job is to ensure that the political process remains intact and is allowed to function."

A rendition of the Great Seal of Canada used during the reign of King Charles III

The Great Seal of Canada "signifies the power and authority of the Crown flowing from the sovereign to [the] parliamentary government" and is applied to state documents such as royal proclamations and letters patent commissioning Cabinet ministers, senators, judges, and other senior government officials. The "lending" of royal authority to Cabinet is illustrated by the great seal being entrusted by the governor general, the official keeper of the seal, to the minister of innovation, science, and economic development, who is ex officio the registrar general of Canada. Upon a change of government, the seal is temporarily returned to the governor general and then "lent" to the next incoming registrar general.

The Crown is the pinnacle of the Canadian Armed Forces, with the constitution placing the monarch in the position of commander-in-chief of the entire force, though the governor general carries out the duties attached to the position and also bears the title of Commander-in-Chief in and over Canada.

=== Executive (King-in-Council) ===
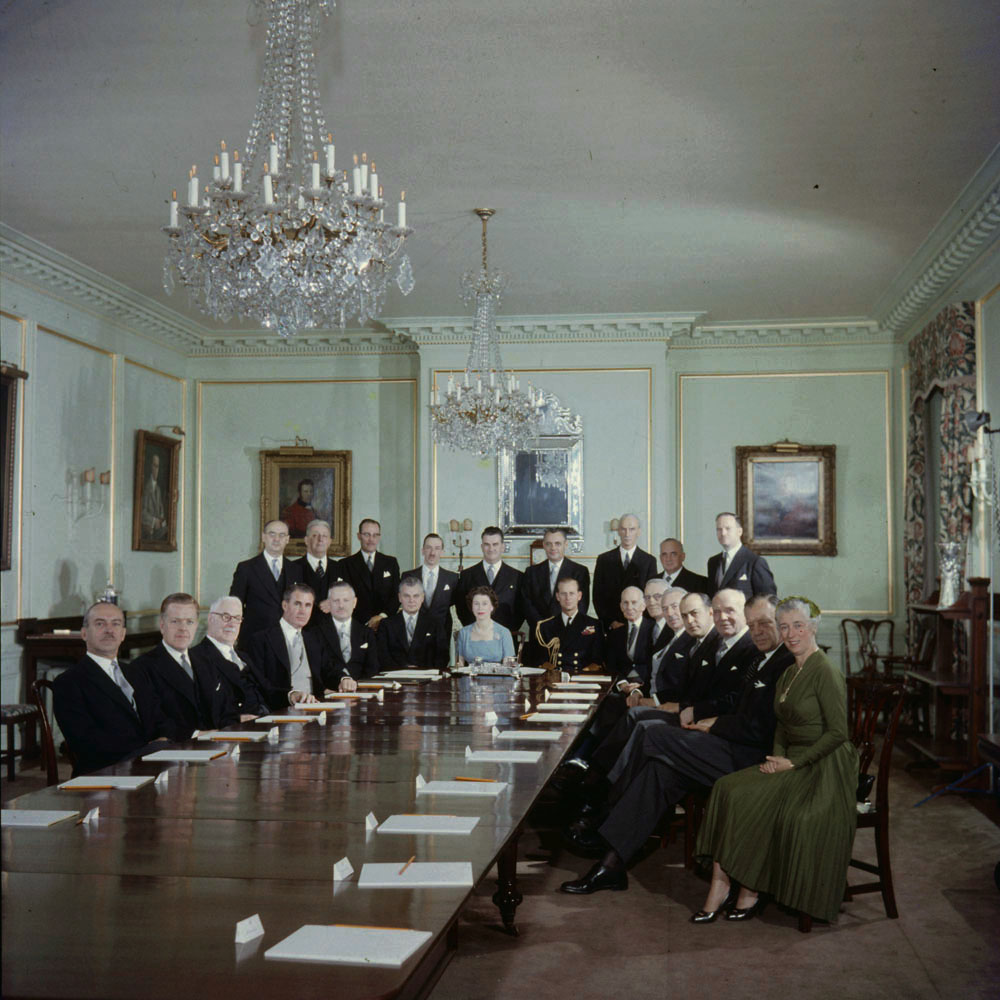
The first meeting of the Queen's Privy Council for Canada before the reigning sovereign, Queen Elizabeth II, in the State Dining Room of Rideau Hall, 14 October 1957

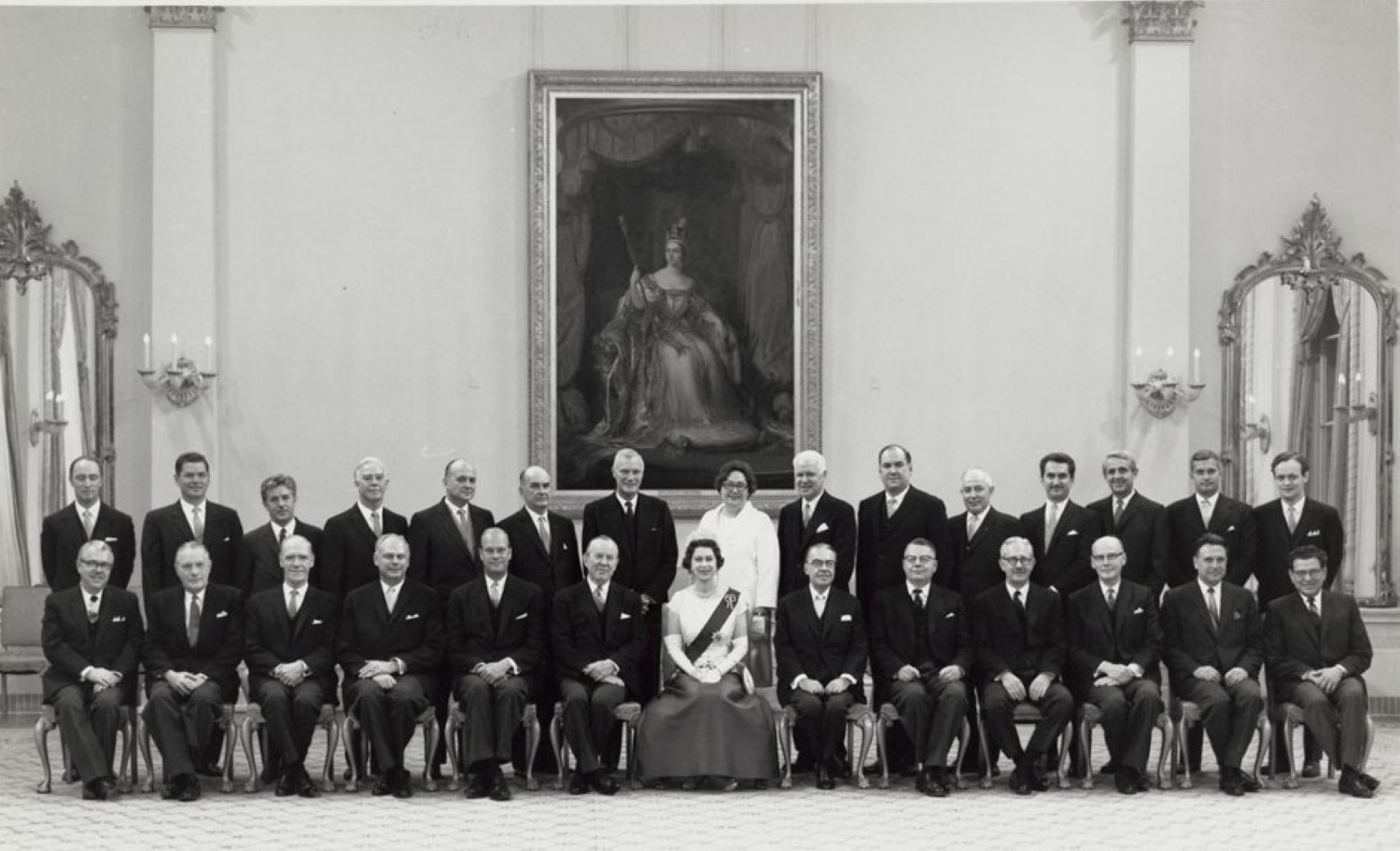
Elizabeth II with her Cabinet in the ballroom of Rideau Hall, on Dominion Day, 1 July 1967, the centennial of Confederation

The government of Canada—formally termed His Majesty's Government—is defined by the constitution as the King acting on the advice of his Privy Council; what is technically known as the King-in-Council, or sometimes the Governor-in-Council, referring to the governor general as the King's stand-in, though, a few tasks must be specifically performed by, or bills that require assent from, the King. One of the main duties of the Crown is to "ensure that a democratically elected government is always in place," which means appointing a prime minister to thereafter head the Cabinet—a committee of the Privy Council charged with advising the Crown on the exercise of the royal prerogative. The monarch is informed by his viceroy of the swearing-in and resignation of prime ministers and other members of the ministry, remains fully briefed through regular communications from his Canadian ministers, and holds audience with them whenever possible. By convention, the content of these communications and meetings remains confidential so as to protect the impartiality of the monarch and his representative. The appropriateness and viability of this tradition in an age of social media has been questioned.

In the construct of constitutional monarchy and responsible government, the ministerial advice tendered is typically binding, meaning the monarch reigns but does not rule, the Cabinet ruling "in trust" for the monarch. This has been the case in Canada since the Treaty of Paris ended the reign of the territory's last absolute monarch, King Louis XV of France. However, the royal prerogative belongs to the Crown and not to any of the ministers and the royal and viceroyal figures may unilaterally use these powers in exceptional constitutional crisis situations (an exercise of the reserve powers), (Note: See 'Responsibilities' and Note 1 at Cabinet of Canada.) thereby allowing the monarch to make sure "the government conducts itself in compliance with the constitution"; he and the viceroys being guarantors of the government's constitutional, as opposed to democratic, legitimacy and must ensure the continuity of such. Use of the royal prerogative in this manner was seen when the Governor General refused his prime minister's advice to dissolve Parliament in 1926 and when, in 2008, the Governor General took some hours to decide whether or not to accept her Prime Minister's advice to prorogue Parliament to avoid a vote of non-confidence. The prerogative powers have also been used numerous times in the provinces.

The royal prerogative further extends to foreign affairs, including the ratification of treaties, alliances, international agreements, and declarations of war, the accreditation of Canadian high commissioners and ambassadors and receipt of similar diplomats from foreign states, and the issuance of Canadian passports, which remain the sovereign's property. It also includes the creation of dynastic and national honours, though only the latter are established on official ministerial advice.

=== Parliament (King-in-Parliament) ===
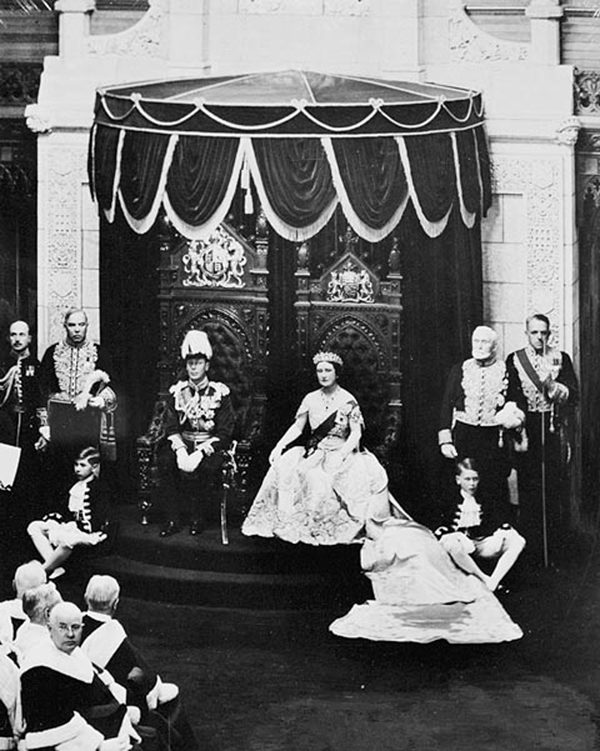
King George VI, with Queen Elizabeth, grants royal assent to bills in the Senate chamber, 1939

All laws in Canada are the monarch's and the sovereign is one of the three components of the Parliament of Canada—formally called the King-in-Parliament—but, the monarch and viceroy do not participate in the legislative process, save for royal consent, typically expressed by a minister of the Crown, and royal assent, which is necessary for a bill to be enacted as law. Either figure or a delegate may perform this task and the constitution allows the viceroy the option of deferring assent to the sovereign.

The governor general is further responsible for summoning the House of Commons, while either the viceroy or monarch can prorogue and dissolve the legislature, after which the governor general usually calls for a general election. This element of the royal prerogative is unaffected by legislation "fixing" election dates, as An Act to Amend the Canada Elections Act specifies that it does not curtail the Crown's powers. The new parliamentary session is marked by either the monarch, governor general, or some other representative reading the Speech from the Throne. Members of Parliament must recite the Oath of Allegiance before they may take their seat. Further, the official opposition is traditionally dubbed as His Majesty's Loyal Opposition, illustrating that, while its members are opposed to the incumbent government, they remain loyal to the sovereign (as personification of the state and its authority).

The monarch does not have the prerogative to impose and collect new taxes without the authorization of an act of Parliament. The consent of the Crown must, however, be obtained before either of the houses of Parliament may even debate a bill affecting the sovereign's prerogatives or interests and no act of Parliament binds the King or his rights unless the act states that it does.

=== Courts (King-on-the-Bench) ===
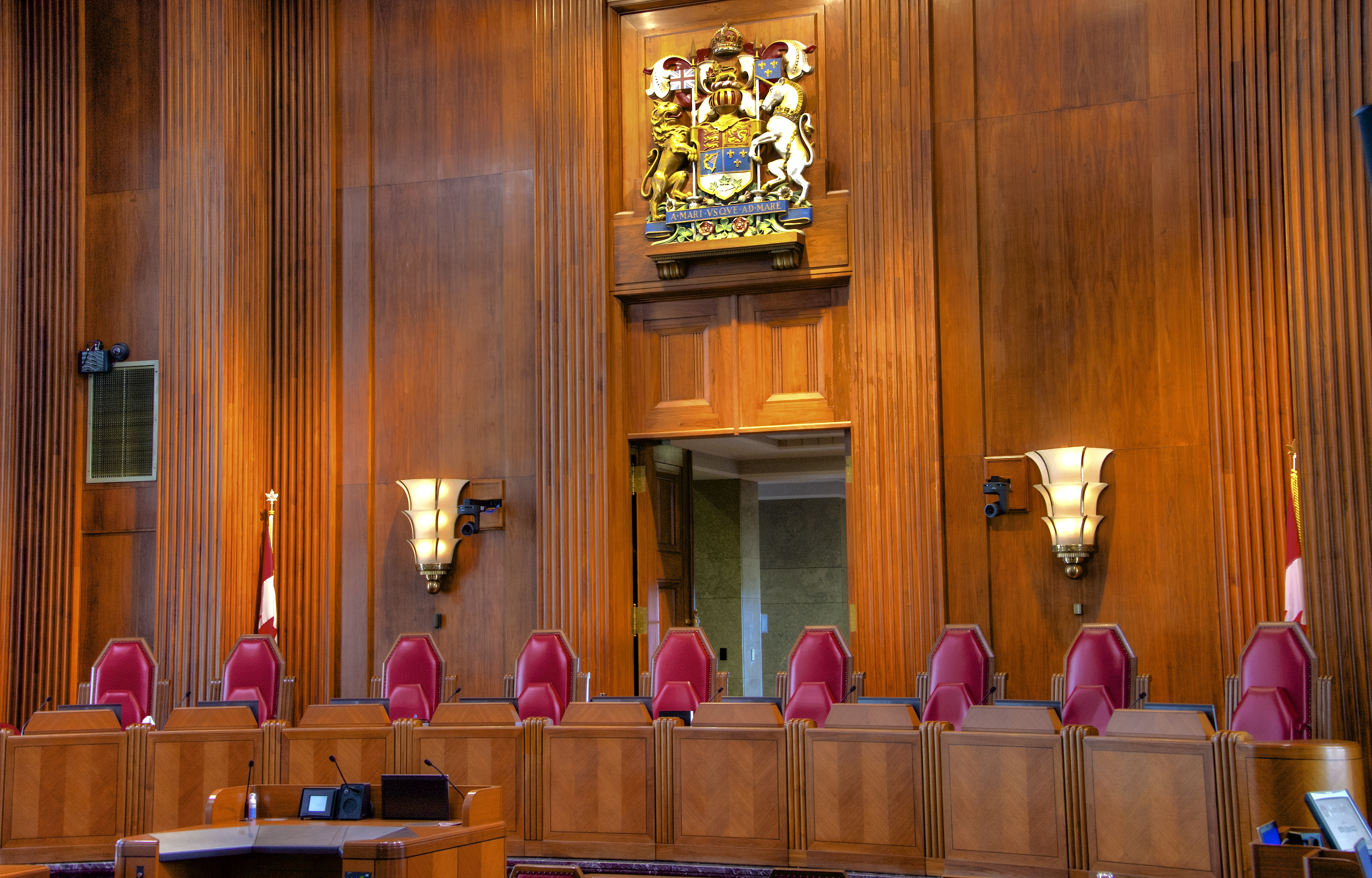
A Supreme Court of Canada courtroom displaying on the focal wall a rendition of the Royal Arms.

The sovereign is traditionally viewed as the fount of justice, although practically speaking, this role is administered by justices in the monarch's name. The sovereign's position in the Canadian courts formally dubbed the King on the Bench. The Arms of His Majesty in Right of Canada, provincial coats of arms or the UK royal arms (for older court rooms) are displayed in Canadian courtrooms, as is a portrait of the sovereign.

Common law holds the notion that the sovereign "can do no wrong": the monarch cannot be prosecuted in his own courts—judged by himself—for criminal offences under his own laws. Canada inherited the common law version of Crown immunity from British law. However, over time, the scope of said immunity has been steadily reduced by statute law. With the passage of relevant legislation through the provincial and federal parliaments, the Crown in its public capacity (that is, lawsuits against the King-in-Council), in all areas of Canada, is now liable in tort, as any normal person would be. In international cases, as a sovereign and under established principles of international law, the King of Canada is not subject to suit in foreign courts without his express consent.

Within the royal prerogative is also the granting of immunity from prosecution, mercy, and pardoning offences against the Crown. Since 1878, the prerogative of pardon has always been exercised upon the recommendation of ministers.

=== The Crown and Indigenous peoples ===
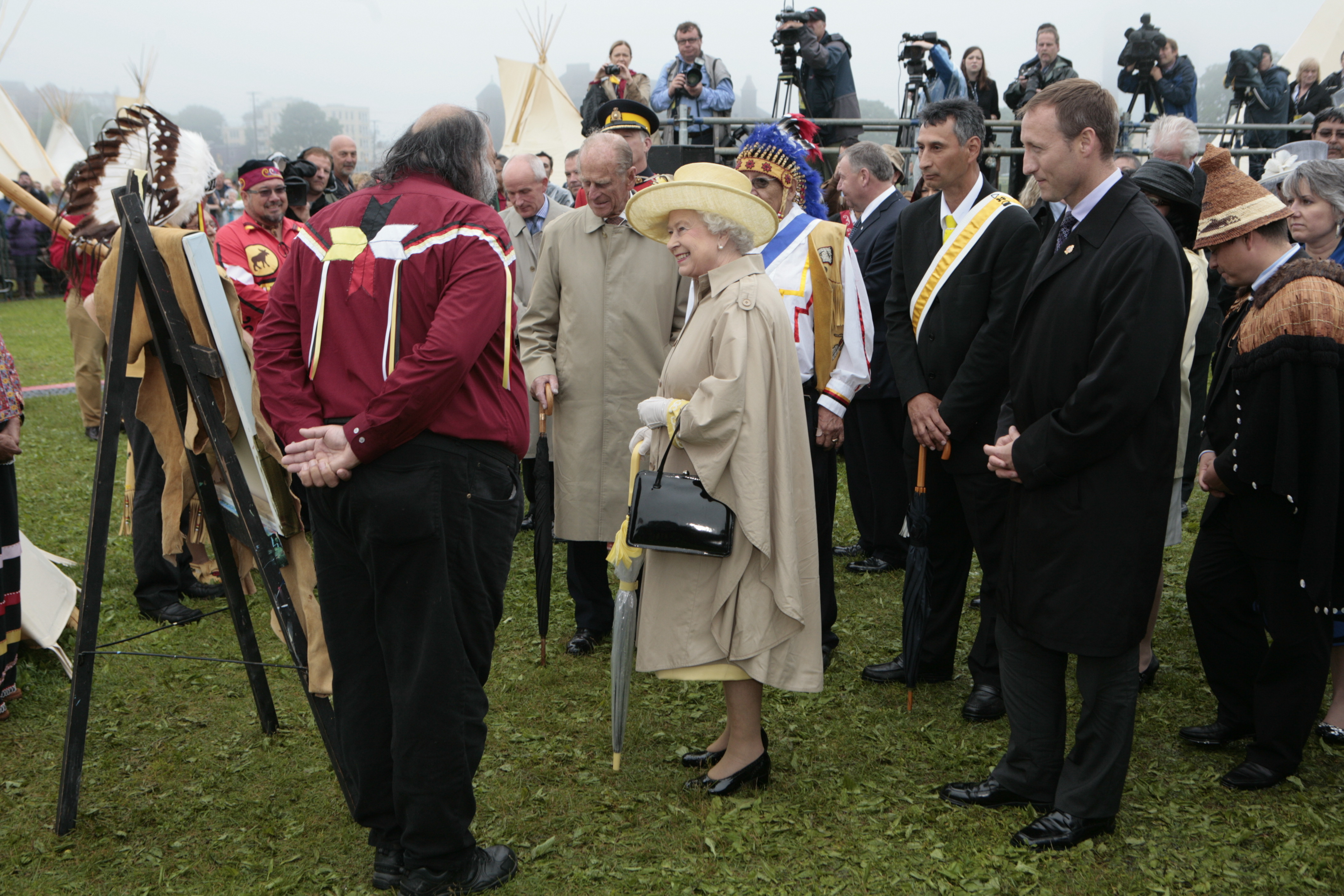
Mi'kmaq leaders present a portrait of Grand Chief Henri Membertou to Queen Elizabeth II in Halifax, Nova Scotia, 28 June 2010

Included in Canada's constitution are the various treaties between the Crown and Canada's First Nations, Inuit, and Métis peoples, who, like the Māori and the Treaty of Waitangi in New Zealand, generally view the affiliation as being not between them and the ever-changing Cabinet, but instead with the continuous Crown of Canada, as embodied in the reigning sovereign, meaning the link between monarch and Indigenous peoples in Canada will theoretically last for "as long as the sun shines, grass grows, and rivers flow."

The association stretches back to the first decisions between North American Indigenous peoples and European colonialists and, over centuries of interface, treaties were established concerning the monarch and indigenous nations. The only treaties that survived the American Revolution are those in Canada, which date to the beginning of the 18th century. Today, the main guide for relations between the monarchy and Canadian First Nations is King George III's Royal Proclamation of 1763; while not a treaty, it is regarded by First Nations as their Magna Carta or "Indian bill of rights", as it affirmed native title to their lands and made clear that, though under the sovereignty of the Crown, the aboriginal bands were autonomous political units in a "nation-to-nation" association with non-native governments, with the monarch as the intermediary. The agreements with the Crown are administered by aboriginal law and overseen by the minister of Crown-Indigenous relations.

I have greatly appreciated the opportunity to discuss [...] the vital process of reconciliation in this country—not a one-off act, of course, but an ongoing commitment to healing, respect and understanding [...] with indigenous and non-indigenous peoples across Canada committing to reflect honestly and openly on the past and to forge a new relationship for the future.

— Prince Charles, Prince of Wales, 2022

The link between the Crown and Indigenous peoples will sometimes be symbolically expressed through ceremony. Gifts have been frequently exchanged and aboriginal titles have been bestowed upon royal and viceregal figures since the early days of indigenous contact with the Crown. As far back as 1710, Indigenous leaders have met to discuss treaty business with royal family members or viceroys in private audience and many continue to use their connection to the Crown to further their political aims; public ceremonies attended by the monarch or another member of the royal family have been employed as a platform on which to present complaints, witnessed by both national and international cameras. Following country-wide protests, beginning in 2012, and the close of the Truth and Reconciliation Commission in 2015, focus turned toward rapprochement between the nations in the nation-to-nation relationship.

==== Hereditary chiefs ====
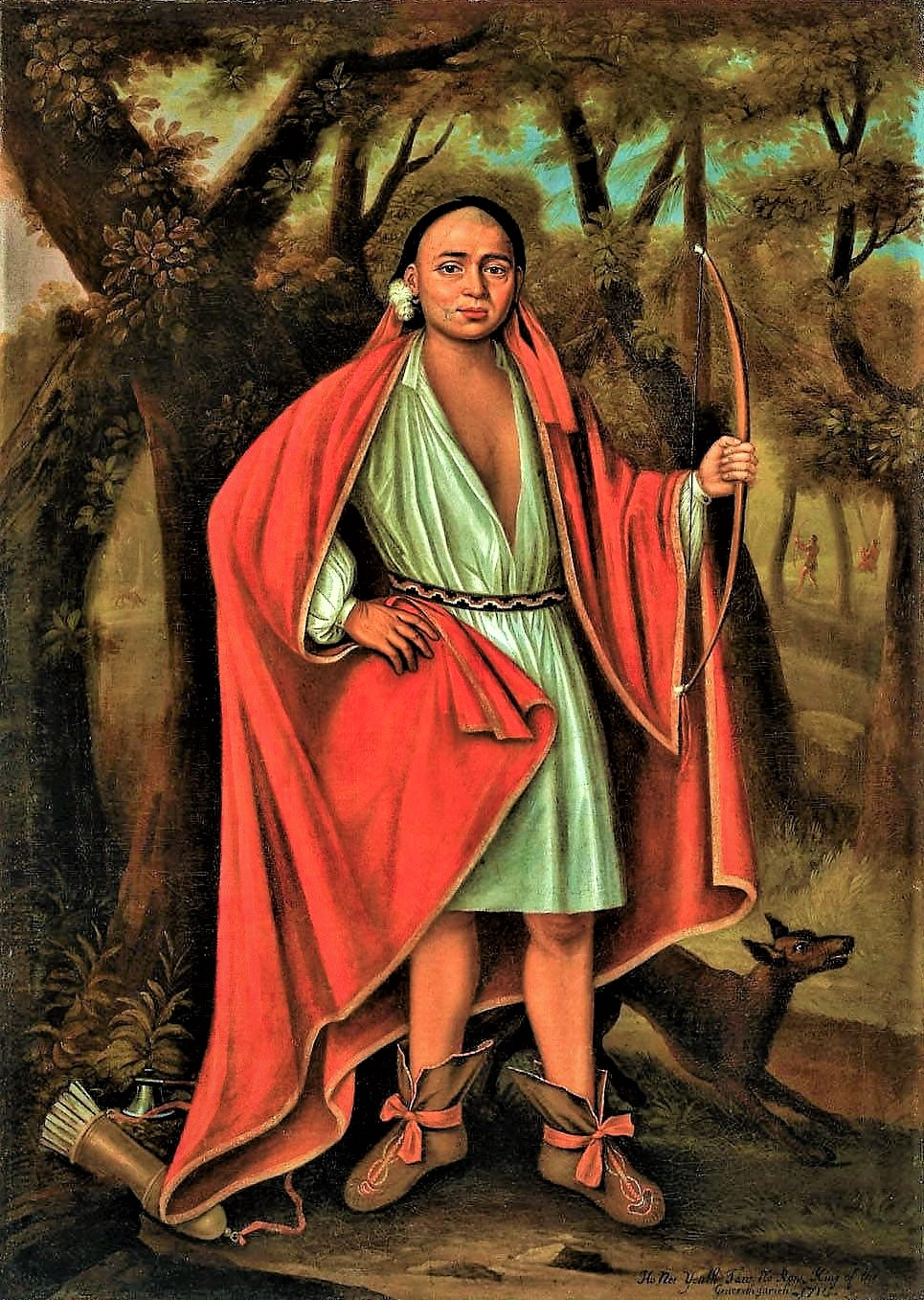
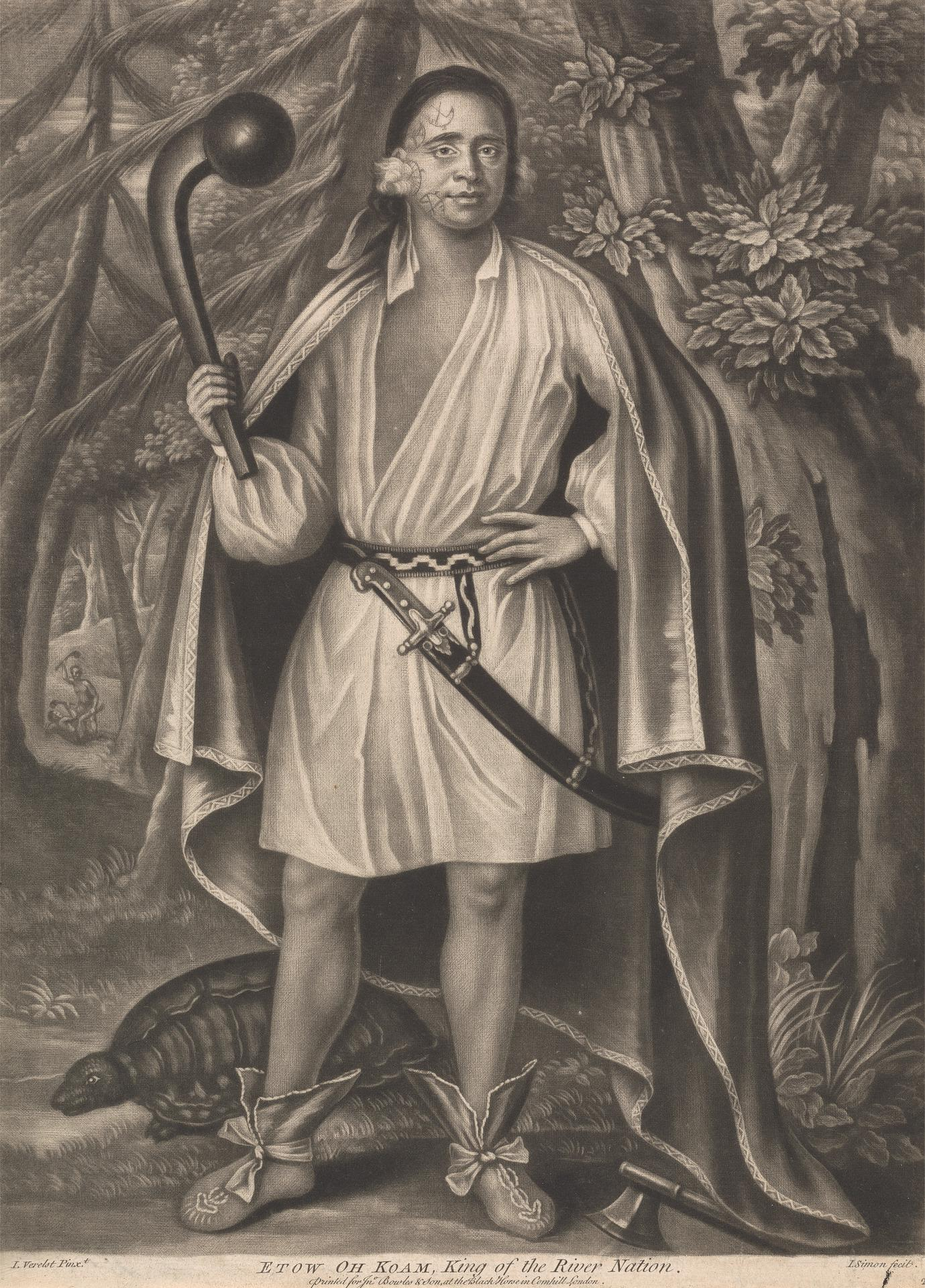
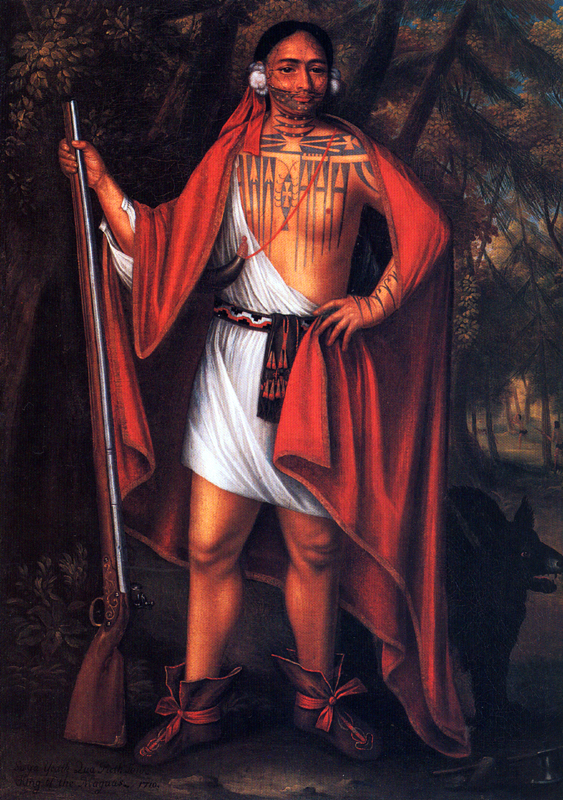
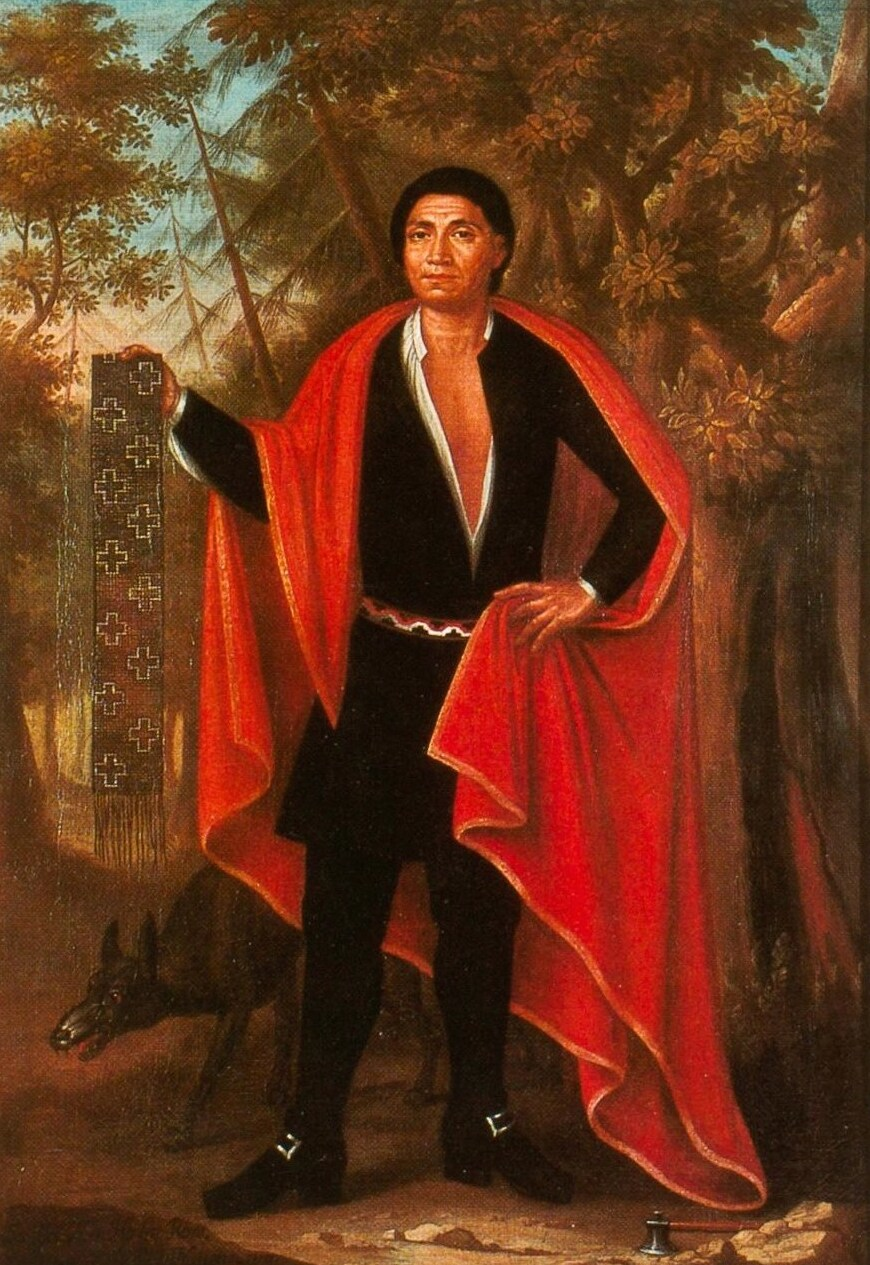
Portraits of the Four Mohawk Kings, painted in 1710, during their visit with Queen Anne

The hereditary chiefs are leaders within First Nations who represent different houses or clans and whose chieftaincies are passed down intergenerationally; most First Nations have a hereditary system. The positions are rooted in traditional models of Indigenous governance that predate the colonization of Canada and are organized in a fashion similar to the occidental idea of monarchy. Indeed, early European explorers often considered territories belonging to different aboriginal groups to be kingdoms—such as along the north shore of the St. Lawrence River, between the Trinity River and the Isle-aux-Coudres, and the neighbouring "kingdom of Canada", which stretched west to the Island of Montreal—and the leaders of these communities were referred to as kings, particularly those chosen through heredity.

Today, the hereditary chiefs are not sovereign; according to the Supreme Court of Canada, the Crown holds sovereignty over the whole of Canada, including reservation and traditional lands. However, by some interpretations of case law from the same court, the chiefs have jurisdiction over traditional territories that fall outside of band-controlled reservation land, beyond the elected band councils established by the Indian Act. Although recognized by, and accountable to, the federal Crown-in-Council (the Government of Canada), band chiefs do not hold the cultural authority of hereditary chiefs, who often serve as knowledge-keepers, responsible for the upholding of a First Nation's traditional customs, legal systems, and cultural practices. When serving as Lieutenant Governor of British Columbia, Judith Guichon postulated that the role of hereditary chiefs mirrored that of Canada's constitutional monarch, being the representative of "sober second thought and wisdom, not the next political cycle; but, rather, enduring truths and the evolution of our nation through generations." For these reasons, the Crown maintains formal relations with Canada's hereditary chiefs, including on matters relating to treaty rights and obligations.

== Cultural role ==
=== Royal presence and duties ===
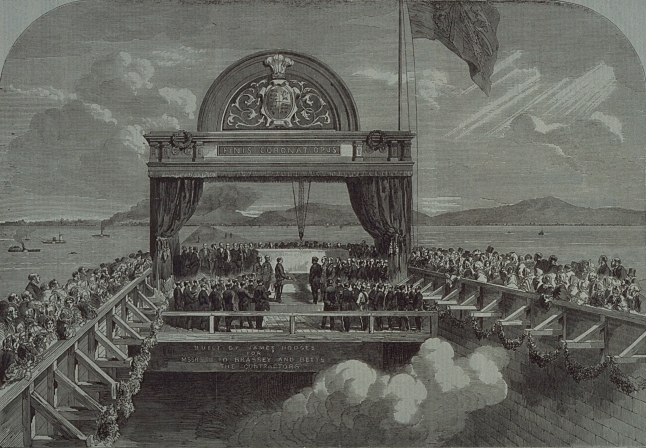
Prince Albert Edward, Prince of Wales, lays the last stone for the Victoria Bridge in Montreal during his 1860 royal tour

Members of the royal family have been present in Canada since the late 18th century, their reasons including participating in military manoeuvres, serving as the federal viceroy, or undertaking official royal tours, which "reinforce [the] country's collective heritage". At least one royal tour has been conducted every year between 1957 and 2018.

The "welfare and service" function of the monarchy is regarded as an important part of the modern monarchy's role and demonstrates a significant change to the institution in recent generations, from a heavily ceremonialized, imperial crown to a "more demotic and visible" head of state "interacting with the general population far beyond confined court circles." As such, a prominent feature of tours are royal walkabouts; a tradition initiated in 1939 by Queen Elizabeth when she was in Ottawa and broke from the royal party to speak directly to gathered veterans. Usually important milestones, anniversaries, or celebrations of Canadian culture will warrant the presence of the monarch, while other members of the royal family will be asked to participate in lesser occasions. A household to assist and tend to the monarch forms part of the royal party.

Official duties involve the sovereign representing the Canadian state at home or abroad, or her relations as members of the royal family participating in government organized ceremonies either in Canada or elsewhere; (Note: Though the royal family represents other countries abroad, as directed by their respective cabinets, and typically the governor general will undertake state visits and other foreign duties on behalf of the Queen of Canada, members of the royal family will also take part in Canadian events overseas.) sometimes these individuals are employed in asserting Canada's sovereignty over its territories. (Note: In 1970, Queen Elizabeth II, the Duke of Edinburgh, Prince Charles, and Princess Anne undertook a tour of Northern Canada, in part to demonstrate to an unconvinced American government and the Soviet Union that Canada had certain claim to its Arctic territories, which were strategic during the Cold War.) The advice of the Canadian Cabinet is the impetus for royal participation in any Canadian event, though, at present, the Chief of Protocol and his staff in the Department of Canadian Heritage are, as part of the State Ceremonial and Canadian Symbols Program, responsible for orchestrating any official events in or for Canada that involve the royal family.

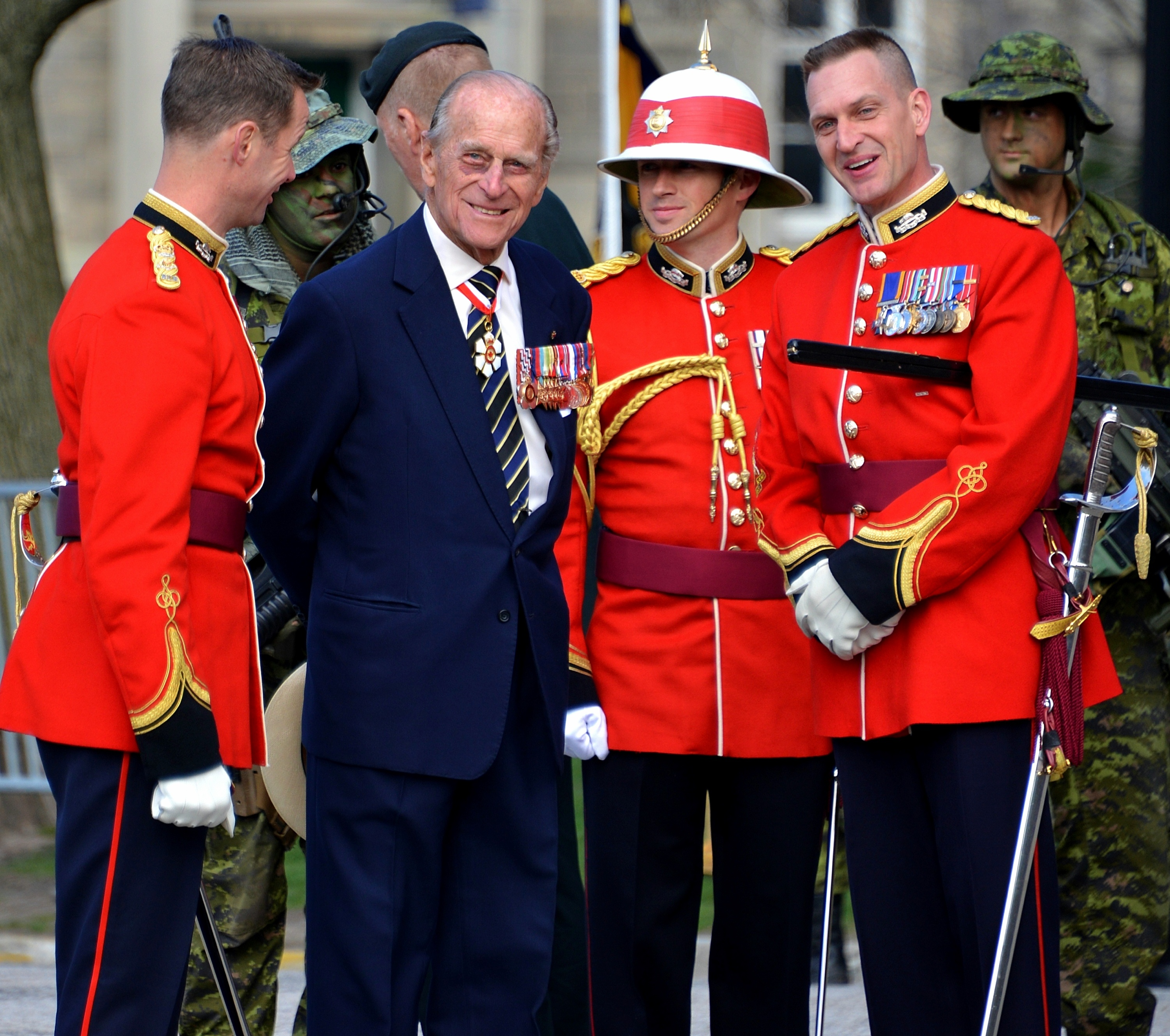
Prince Philip with the Royal Canadian Regiment as their colonel-in-chief, April 2013

Conversely, unofficial duties are performed by royal family members for Canadian organizations of which they may be patrons, through their attendance at charity events, visiting with members of the Canadian Forces as colonel-in-chief, or marking certain key anniversaries. The invitation and expenses associated with these undertakings are usually borne by the associated organization. In 2005, members of the royal family were present at a total of 76 Canadian engagements, as well as several more through 2006 and 2007. In the period between 2019 and 2022, they carried out 53 engagements, the number reduced, and all through the latter year and a half being virtual, because of restrictions in place during the COVID-19 pandemic. The various viceroys took part in 4,023 engagements through 2019 and 2020, both in-person and virtually.

Apart from Canada, the King and other members of the royal family regularly perform public duties in the other 14 Commonwealth realms in which the King is head of state. This situation, however, can mean the monarch and members of the royal family will be promoting one nation and not another; a situation that has been met with criticism. (Note: Former Minister of External Affairs Mitchell Sharp commented on a situation wherein Elizabeth II was in Latin America to promote British goods at the same time a Canadian ministerial trip to the same area was underway to promote Canadian products. Sharp stated: "We couldn't ask Her Majesty to perform the function she was performing for Britain on that Latin American trip because the Queen is never recognized as Queen of Canada, except when she is in Canada." The Queen's participation in Canadian events overseas contradicts Sharp's statement, however.)

=== Symbols, associations, and awards ===
The main symbol of the monarchy is the sovereign himself, described as "the personal expression of the Crown in Canada," and his image is thus used to signify Canadian sovereignty and government authority—his image, for instance, appearing on currency, and his portrait in government buildings. The sovereign is further both mentioned in and the subject of songs, loyal toasts, and salutes. A royal cypher, appearing on buildings and official seals, or a crown, seen on provincial and national coats of arms, as well as police force and Canadian Forces regimental and maritime badges and rank insignia, is also used to illustrate the monarchy as the locus of authority, the latter without referring to any specific monarch.

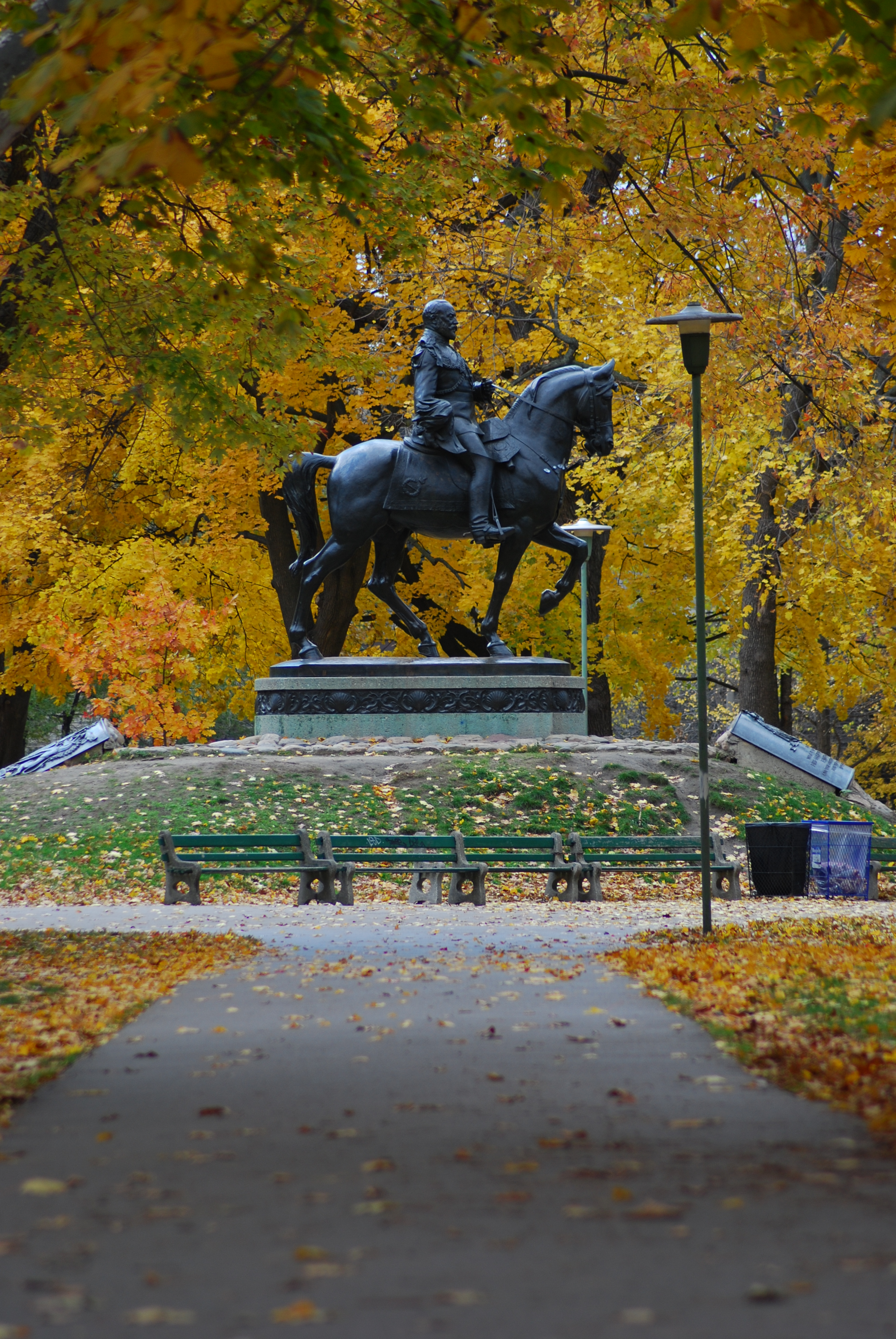
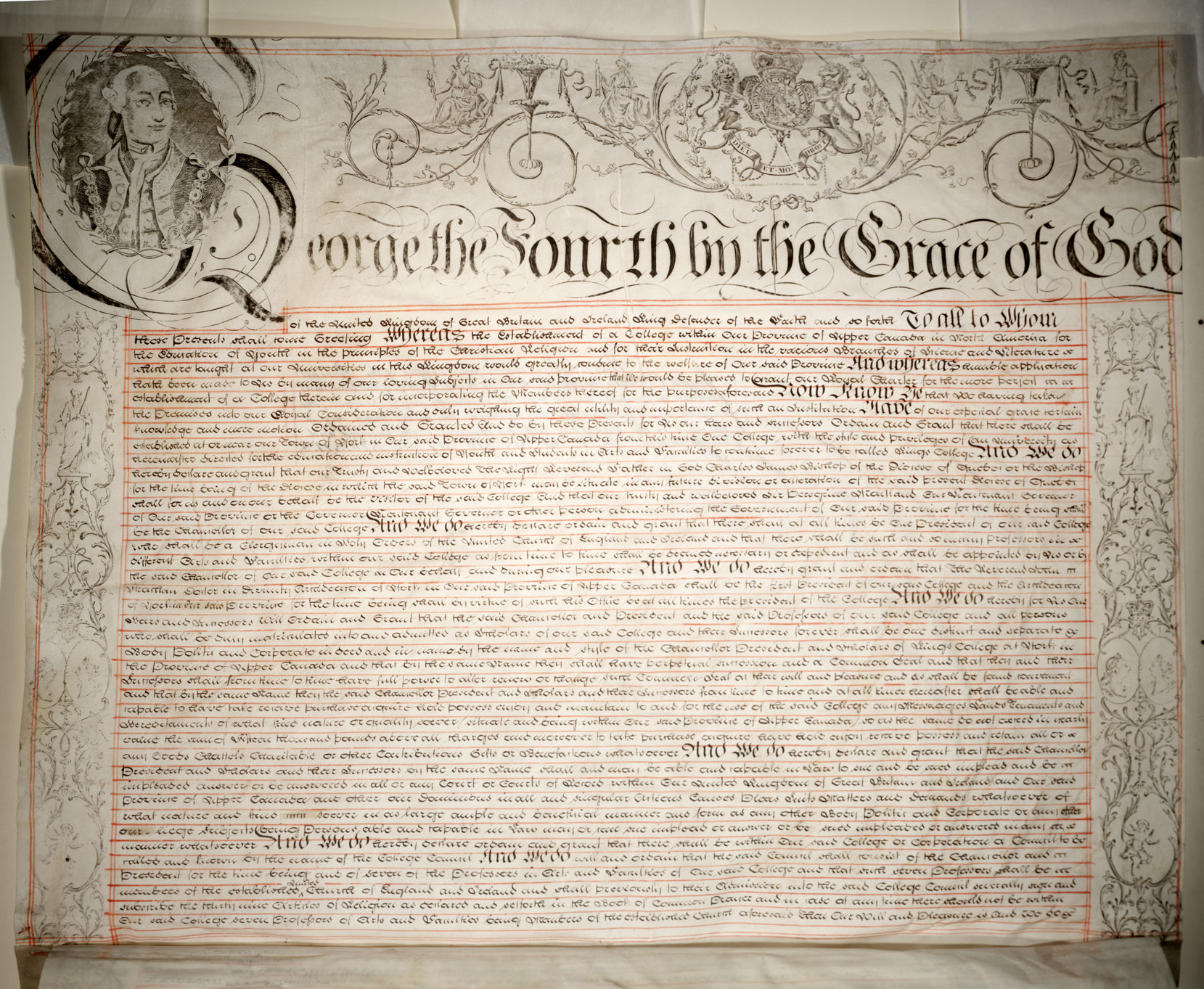
(Clockwise from top) equestrian statue of King Edward VII, Queen's Park, Toronto; George IV's royal charter establishing the University of Toronto; flag of the Canadian Armed Forces, with a St. Edward's Crown atop the forces' emblem; Sovereign's Medal for Volunteers, with the effigy of Elizabeth II wearing a snowflake diadem

Since the days of King Louis XIV, the monarch is the fount of all honours in Canada and the orders, decorations, and medals form "an integral element of the Crown." Hence, the insignia and medallions for these awards bear a crown, cypher or portrait of the monarch. Similarly, the country's heraldic authority was created by Queen Elizabeth II and, operating under the authority of the governor general, grants new coats of arms, flags, and badges in Canada. Use of the royal crown in such symbols is a gift from the monarch showing royal support or association and requires his approval before being added.

King Charles III's Cypher in Canada

Members of the royal family also act as ceremonial colonels-in-chief, commodores-in-chief, captains-general, air commodores-in-chief, generals, and admirals of various elements of the Canadian Forces, reflecting the Crown's relationship with the country's military through participation in events both at home and abroad. (Note: Such events include Troopings of the Colour, inspections of the troops, and anniversaries of key battles; whenever the sovereign or a member of his family is in Ottawa, they lay a wreath at the National War Memorial.) The monarch also serves as the Commissioner-in-Chief, and Prince Edward and Princess Anne as Honorary Deputy Commissioners, of the Royal Canadian Mounted Police.

A number of Canadian civilian organizations have association with the monarchy, either through their being founded via a royal charter, having been granted the right to use the prefix royal before their name, or because at least one member of the royal family serves as a patron. In addition to The Prince's Trust Canada, established by Charles III when Prince of Wales, some other charities and volunteer organizations have also been founded as gifts to, or in honour of, some of Canada's monarchs or members of the royal family, such as the Victorian Order of Nurses, a gift to Queen Victoria for her Diamond Jubilee in 1897; the Canadian Cancer Fund, set up in honour of King George V's Silver Jubilee in 1935; and the Queen Elizabeth II Fund to Aid in Research on the Diseases of Children. A number of awards in Canada are likewise issued in the name of previous or present members of the royal family. Further, organizations will give commemorative gifts to members of the royal family to mark a visit or other important occasion. All Canadian coins bear the image of the monarch reigning at the time of the coin's production, with an inscription, Dei gratia Rex (often abbreviated to DG Rex), a Latin phrase translated to English as, "by the grace of God, king". During the reign of a female monarch, rex is replaced with regina, which is Latin for 'queen'.

Throughout the 1970s, symbols of the monarch and monarchy were slowly removed from the public eye. For instance, the Queen's portrait was seen less in public schools and the Royal Mail became Canada Post. Smith attributed this to the attitude the government of the day held toward Canada's past; though, it never raised the policy in public or during any of the constitutional conferences held that decade. Andrew Heard argued, however, that dispensing with such symbols was necessary to facilitate the simultaneous increasing embrace of the monarch as Queen of Canada. Emblems such as the Royal Coat of Arms remained, however, and others, such as the monarch's royal standard, were created. With the later developments of the governor general's flag, foundation of the Canadian Heraldic Authority, royal standards for other members of the royal family, and the like, Canada, along with New Zealand, is one of the two realms that have "paid the greatest attention to the nationalization of the visual symbols of the monarchy."

=== Significance to Canadian identity ===
In his 2018 book, The Canadian Kingdom: 150 Years of Constitutional Monarchy, Jackson wrote that "the Canadian manifestation of the monarchy is not only historical and constitutional, it is political, cultural, and social, reflecting, and contributing to, change and evolution in Canada's governance, autonomy, and identity." Since at least the 1930s, supporters of the Crown have held the opinion that the monarch is a unifying focal point for the nation's "historic consciousness"—the country's heritage being "unquestionably linked with the history of monarchy"—and Canadian patriotism, traditions, and shared values, "around which coheres the nation's sense of a continuing personality". This infusion of monarchy into Canadian governance and society helps strengthen Canadian identity and distinguish it from American identity, a difference that has existed since at least 1864, when it was a factor in the Fathers of Confederation choosing to keep constitutional monarchy for the new country in 1866. Former Governor General Vincent Massey articulated in 1967 that the monarchy "stands for qualities and institutions which mean Canada to every one of us and which, for all our differences and all our variety, have kept Canada Canadian."

I want the Crown in Canada to represent everything that is best and most admired in the Canadian ideal. I will continue to do my best to make it so during my lifetime.

— Elizabeth II, 1973

But, Canadians were, through the late 1960s to the 2000s, encouraged by federal and provincial governments to "neglect, ignore, forget, reject, debase, suppress, even hate, and certainly treat as foreign what their parents and grandparents, whether spiritual or blood, regarded as the basis of Canadian nationhood, autonomy, and history", including the monarchy resulting in a disconnect between the Canadian populace and their monarch. Former Governor General Roland Michener said in 1970 that anti-monarchists claimed the Canadian Crown is foreign and incompatible with Canada's multicultural society, which the government promoted as a Canadian identifier, and Lawrence Martin called in 2007 for Canada to become a republic in order to "re-brand the nation". However, Michener also stated, "[the monarchy] is our own by inheritance and choice, and contributes much to our distinctive Canadian identity and our chances of independent survival amongst the republics of North and South America." Journalist Christina Blizzard emphasized in 2009 that the monarchy "made [Canada] a haven of peace and justice for immigrants from around the world", while Michael Valpy contended in 2009 that the Crown's nature permitted non-conformity amongst its subjects, thereby opening the door to multiculturalism and pluralism. Johnston described the Crown as providing "space for our values and beliefs as Canadians."

=== In media and popular culture ===
==== Painting and sculpture ====
Aside from official artworks, such as monuments and portraits commissioned by government bodies, Canadian painters have, by their own volition or for private organizations, created more expressive, informal depictions of Canada's monarchs and other members of the royal family, ranging from fine art to irreverent graffiti. For example, the English-Canadian artist Frederic Marlett Bell-Smith produced The Artist Painting Queen Victoria in 1895, which now resides at the National Gallery of Canada. At Library and Archives Canada is the painting The Unveiling of the National War Memorial, capturing the dedication of the monument, in Ottawa, by King George VI and Queen Elizabeth in 1939; though, the artist is unknown.

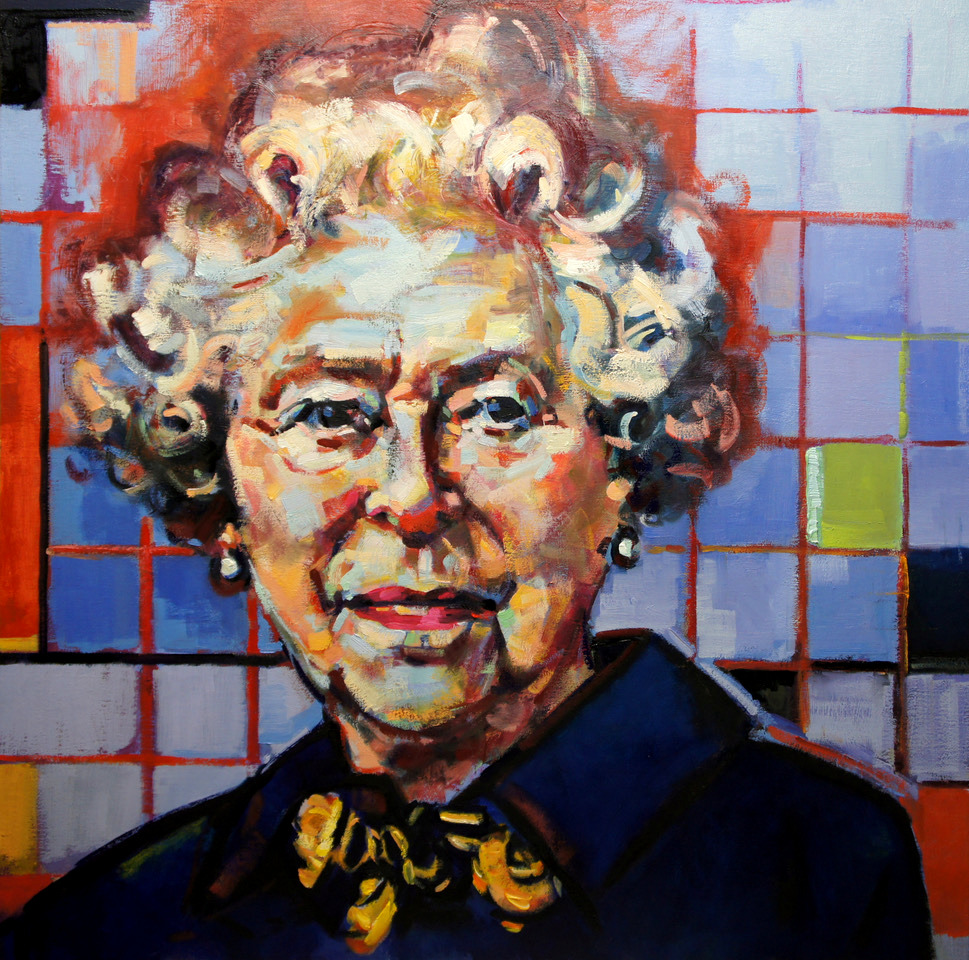
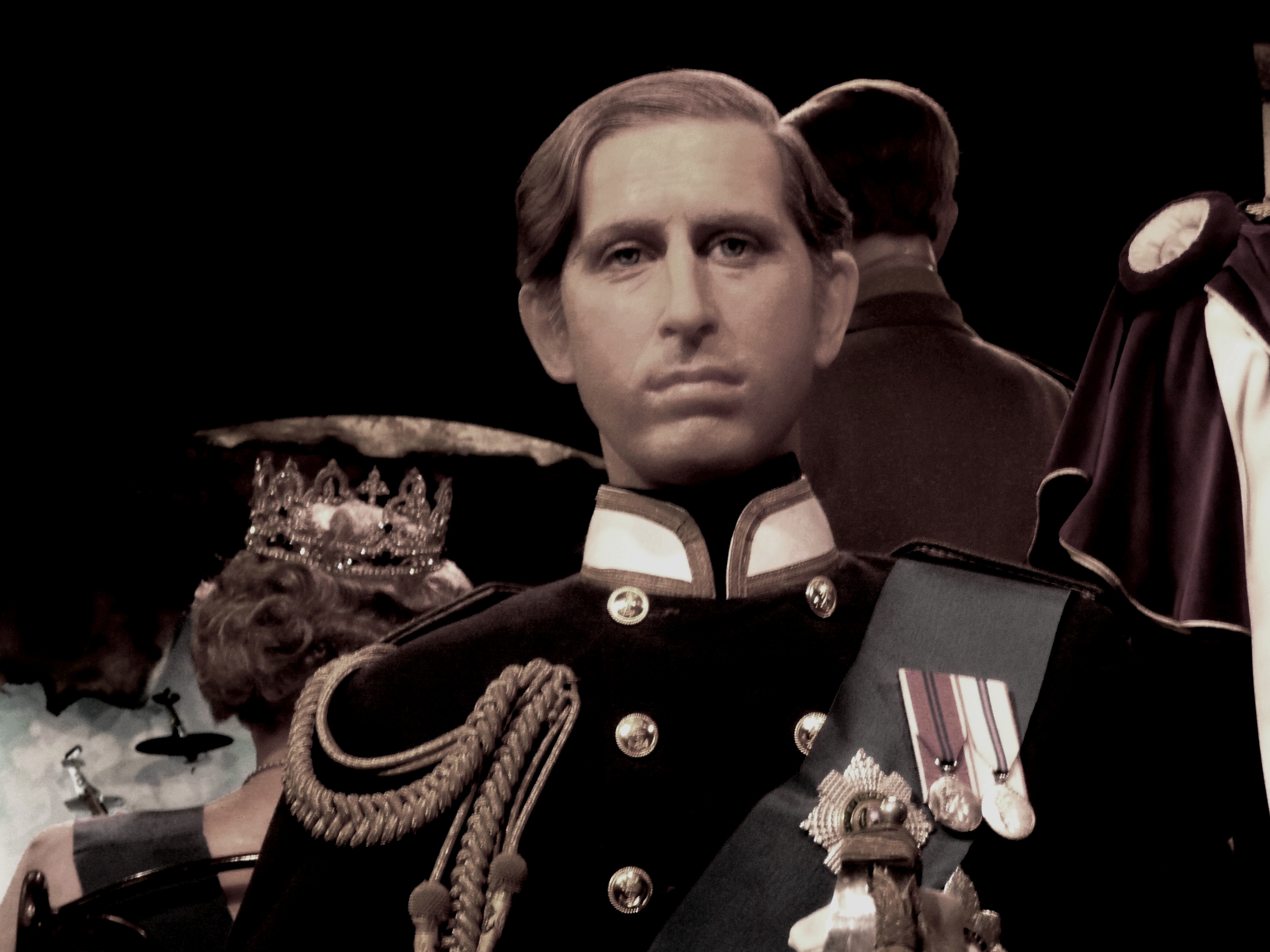
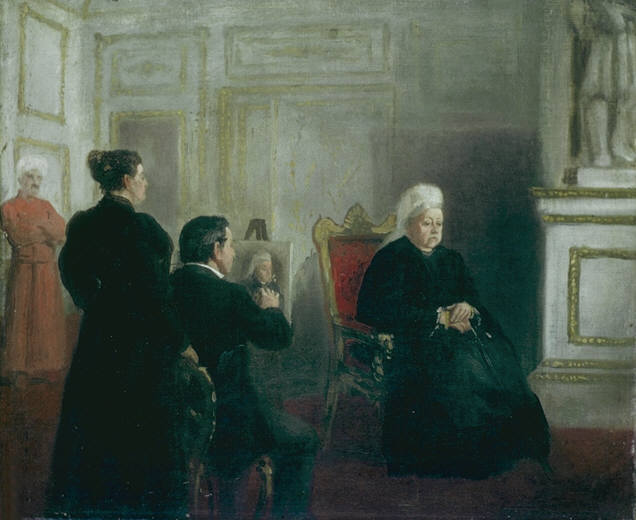
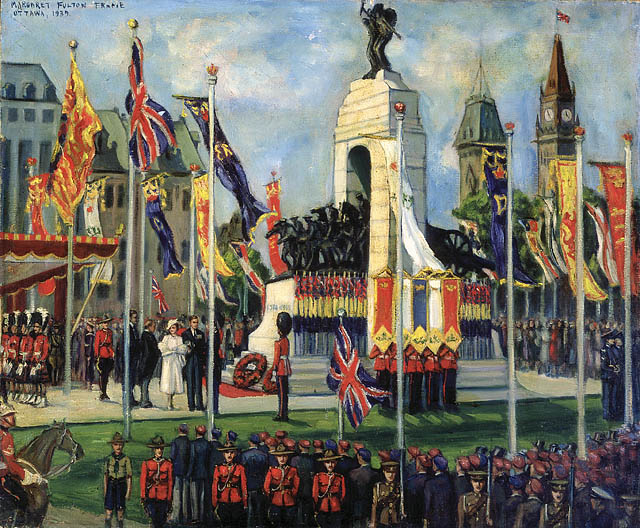
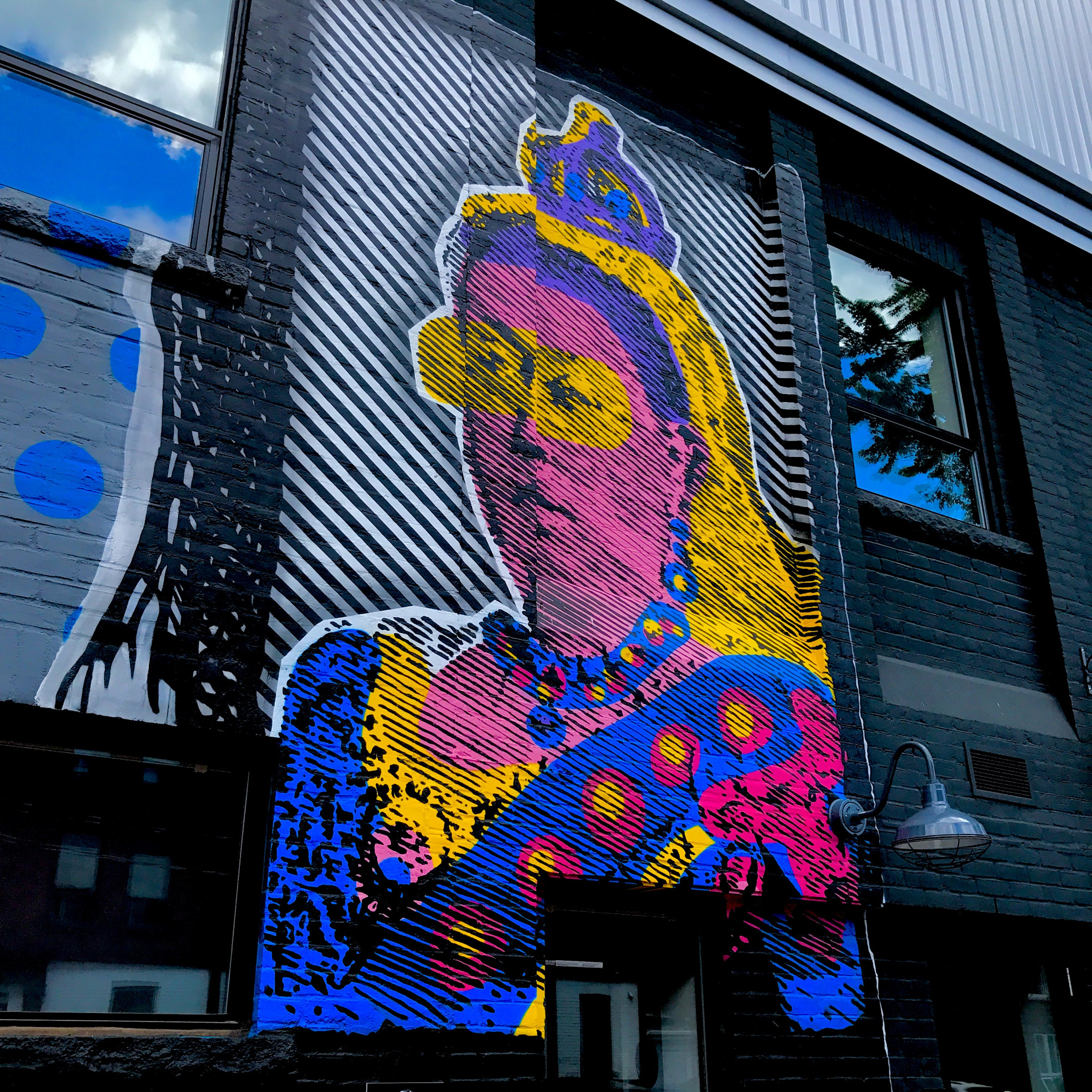
(Clockwise from top) portrait of Elizabeth II by Lorena Ziraldo, 2014; wax figure of Prince Charles (now Charles III) at the Royal London Wax Museum, Victoria; Frederic Marlett Bell-Smith's The Artist Painting Queen Victoria, 1895; pop art portrait of Victoria, Toronto; The Unveiling of the National War Memorial, 1939; irreverent graffiti in Montreal depicting Elizabeth II

Hilton Hassell depicted Princess Elizabeth (later Queen Elizabeth II) square dancing at Rideau Hall in 1951 and a portrait of Elizabeth II by Lorena Ziraldo, of Ottawa, was featured in the Hill Times and Ottawa Citizen.

Charles Pachter, from Toronto, fashioned the painting Noblesse Oblige in 1972, which shows Queen Elizabeth II, in her Guards Regiment uniform and saluting, as she did during Trooping the Colour ceremonies, except atop a moose instead of her horse, Burmese. Despite great controversy when it was first exhibited, it "has become a Canadian cultural image; the people's image". Pachter, subsequently made numerous variations on the theme, including Queen & Moose (1973) and The Queen on a Moose (1988). The artist said, "there was an amazing symmetry of putting the sovereign of her northern realm (Canada) on an animal who is the 'monarch of the north, awkward but majestic'". Pachter made similar pieces showing Elizabeth's son, Prince Charles (now King Charles III) and his wife, Camilla, standing alongside a moose and Charles's son, Prince William, and his wife, Catherine, with Canadian wildlife, such as a moose and a squirrel. For Elizabeth II's Diamond Jubilee, Pachter created a series of fake postage stamps using all his paintings that include members of the royal family, which he called "my branded images for Canada." Some were featured on accessory items sold at the Hudson's Bay Company.

A portrait of Elizabeth II hung in Maple Leaf Gardens until the early 1970s, when owner Harold Ballard had it removed to construct more seating, stating, "if people want to see pictures of the Queen, they can go to an art gallery." Three large portraits of Elizabeth II were created for Winnipeg Arena, on display there from the building's opening in 1955 to 1999.

At the time of the sesquicentennial of Confederation in 2017, Vancouver Island-based artist Timothy Hoey created a "Canada 150" version of his decade-long "O Canada" project, painting 150 Canadian icons in acrylic paint on 20.3 by 25.4 centimetre (eight by 10 inch) boards. Among them are numerous depictions of Queen Elizabeth II with other Canadian icons, such as beavers, Cheezies, the Grey Cup, the Stanley Cup, a bottle of beer (O Canada Liz Enjoying Some Wobbly-Pops), Rush (O Canada Closer to the Heart), the Hudson's Bay point blanket, the Trans-Canada Highway, a birch canoe, a buckskin jacket, the Royal Canadian Mounted Police uniform, a Montreal Canadiens hockey sweater, and so on. Hoey had previously painted Elizabeth, in formal attire and tiara, holding a hockey stick in front of a Hudson's Bay point blanket; the work titled O-Canada Liz. In 2021, he depicted the Queen in a decorative hat, uniform of the Vancouver Canucks from the 1978–1979 season, and full goaltender equipment.

The also exist wax sculptures of Queen Elizabeth II in private museums, such as the Royal London Wax Museum in Victoria, British Columbia, and the Wax Museum of History in Niagara Falls, Ontario.

==== Television ====
The television series Rideau Hall, starring Bette MacDonald, was produced by the Canadian Broadcasting Corporation and aired for one season in 2002. Its premise was a brash, one-hit wonder disco artist being appointed governor general on the advice of a republican prime minister.

External videos
- Scott Thompson as The Queen Source: Broadway Video.

Canadian comedian Scott Thompson regularly played a parody of Queen Elizabeth II in a Canadian context on the sketch comedy television show The Kids in the Hall, as well as in other productions, such as The Queen's Toast: A Royal Wedding Special and Conan. Thompson also voiced a portrayal of Queen Elizabeth II in Canada in the animated television show Fugget About It, in the episode "Royally Screwed".

The Canadian monarchy was parodied in "Royal Pudding", the third episode of the 15th season of the animated television show South Park, which first aired on 11 May 2011. The opening focuses on a spoof of the wedding of Prince William and Catherine Middleton, featuring caricatures of Queen Elizabeth II; Prince William, Prince of Wales; and Catherine, Princess of Wales. Specific mention is made of "the Queen of Canada" and "the Canadian royal family". The show subsequently, in the second episode of the 26th season, "The Worldwide Privacy Tour", parodied the Duke and Duchess of Sussex as a prince of Canada and "the wife", who, after hostile treatment at the funeral of the late Queen of Canada, go on national television and a world tour demanding people and the media not pay attention to them and branding themselves as victims.

== Royal family and house ==
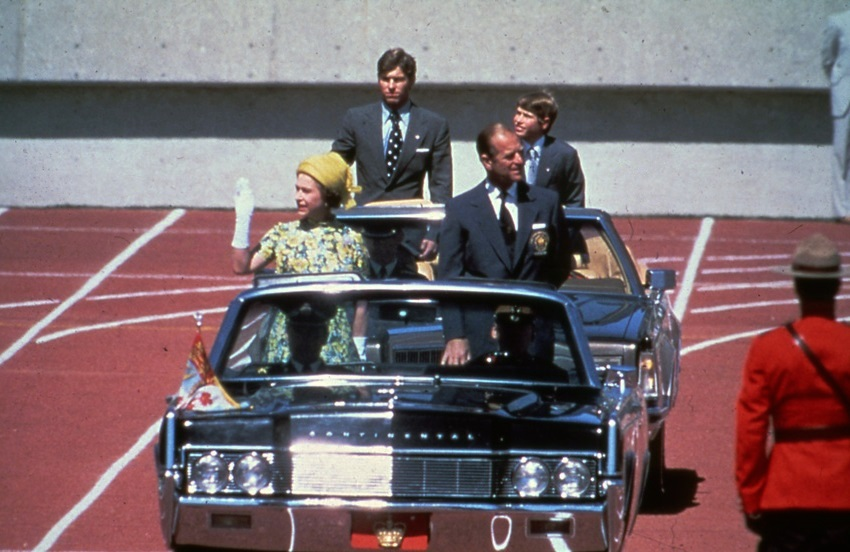
Members of the royal family standing in convertibles during the opening of 1978 Commonwealth Games in Edmonton; Elizabeth II (front, left), Prince Philip (front, right), Prince Andrew (rear, left), and Prince Edward (rear, right)

The Canadian royal family is the group of people who are comparatively closely related to the country's monarch and, as such, belong to the House of Windsor and owe their allegiance specifically to the reigning king or queen of Canada. There is no legal definition of who is or is not a member of the royal family; though, the Government of Canada's website lists "working members of the royal family".

Unlike in the United Kingdom, the monarch is the only member of the royal family with a title established through Canadian law and is styled by convention as His/Her Majesty, as would be a queen consort. Otherwise, the remaining family members are, as a courtesy, styled and titled as they are in the UK, according to letters patent issued there, with additional French translations.

Those in the royal family are distant relations of the Belgian, Danish, Greek, Norwegian, Spanish, and Swedish royal families and, given the shared nature of the Canadian monarch, are also members of the British royal family. While Canadian and foreign media often refer to them as the "British royal family", the Canadian government considers it inappropriate, as they are family members of the Canadian monarch. Further, in addition to the few Canadian citizens in the royal family, (Note: Two Canadian citizens married into the royal family: In 1988, Sylvana Jones (née Tomaselli in Placentia, Newfoundland) wed George Windsor, Earl of St Andrews, a great-grandson of King George V, and, on 18 May 2008, Autumn Kelly, originally from Montreal, married Queen Elizabeth II's eldest grandson, Peter Phillips. The latter couple has two children, 19th and 20th in line to the throne as of 2024, who each hold dual Canadian and British citizenship, as do the three children of George Windsor, though only the youngest, Lady Amelia Windsor, is in line to the throne, 43rd as of 2023. More distantly, Princes Boris and Hermann Friedrich of Leiningen, great-great-great grandsons of Queen Victoria, are also Canadian citizens.) the sovereign is considered Canadian, and those among his relations who do not meet the requirements of Canadian citizenship law are considered Canadian, which entitles them to Canadian consular assistance and the protection of the King's armed forces of Canada when they are in need of protection or aid outside of the Commonwealth realms, as well as, since 2013, substantive appointment to the Order of Canada and Order of Military Merit. Beyond formalities, members of the royal family have, on occasion, been said by the media and non-governmental organizations to be Canadian, (Note: As early as 1959, it was recognized that Queen Elizabeth II, was "equally at home in all her realms"; By the 1960s, loyal societies in Canada recognized the Elizabeth's cousin, Princess Alexandra, the Honourable Lady Ogilvy, as a "Canadian princess"; and, at the time of the 2011 royal tour of Prince William, Duke of Cambridge, and Catherine, Duchess of Cambridge, both Michael Valpy, writing for the CBC, and The Globe and Mail referred to William as "a prince of Canada".) have declared themselves to be Canadian, (Note: In 1919, Prince Edward Albert (the future King Edward VIII) asserted, "I want Canada to look upon me as a Canadian, if not actually by birth, yet certainly in mind and spirit." Princess Elizabeth, Duchess of Edinburgh, said in 1951 that, when in Canada, she was "amongst fellow countrymen" and, after acceding to the throne as Queen Elizabeth II, she, when departing the United States for Canada in 1983, stated to President Ronald Reagan, "I'm going home to Canada tomorrow". In 2005, Elizabeth said she agreed with the statement earlier made by her mother, Queen Elizabeth, the Queen Mother, that Canada felt like a "home away from home"; in the same year, she remarked, "I have always felt not only welcome but at home in Canada." Similarly, the Queen said in 2010, in Nova Scotia, "it is very good to be home".) and some past members have lived in Canada for extended periods as viceroy or for other reasons. (Note: Prince Edward, Duke of Kent and Strathearn, served as the Commander of British North American troops in Canada's Maritimes for nine years after 1791, mostly in Halifax; his granddaughter, Princess Louise, Marchioness of Lorne, lived in Canada between 1878 and 1883 as viceregal consort; and her brother, Prince Arthur, Duke of Connaught and Strathearn, resided in Canada first through 1870 as a member of the Canadian Militia, defending Canada from the Fenian Raids, and then as governor general from 1911 until 1916. Later, for six years beginning in 1940, Princess Alice, Countess of Athlone (a great-grandchild of the Duke of Kent), lived in Canada with her husband, the Earl of Athlone (himself a great-grandchild of King George III), while he served as governor general.)

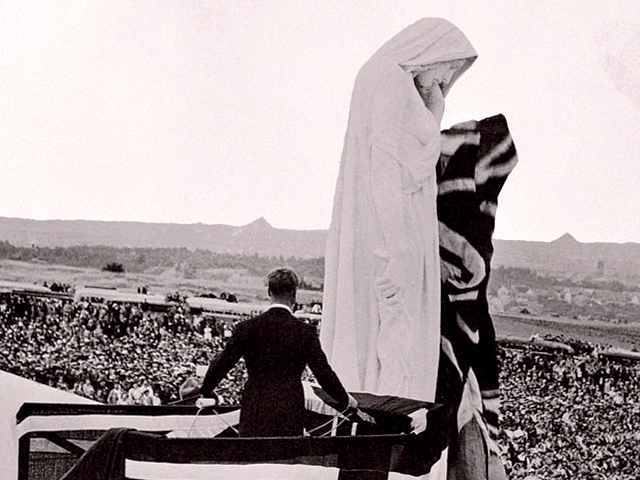
King Edward VIII unveiling the figure Canada Bereft on the Canadian National Vimy Memorial in July 1936

According to the Canadian Royal Heritage Trust, Prince Edward Augustus, Duke of Kent and Strathearn—due to his having lived in Canada between 1791 and 1800 and fathering Queen Victoria—is the "ancestor of the modern Canadian royal family". Nonetheless, the concept of the Canadian royal family did not emerge until after the passage of the Statute of Westminster in 1931, when Canadian officials only began to overtly consider putting the principles of Canada's new status as an independent kingdom into effect. Initially, the monarch was the only member of the royal family to carry out public ceremonial duties solely on the advice of Canadian ministers; King Edward VIII became the first to do so when in July 1936 he dedicated the Canadian National Vimy Memorial in France. Over the decades, however, the monarch's children, grandchildren, cousins, and their respective spouses began to also perform functions at the direction of the Canadian Crown-in-Council, representing the monarch within Canada or abroad, in a role specifically as members of the Canadian royal family.

However, it was not until October 2002 when the term Canadian royal family was first used publicly and officially by one of its members: in a speech to the Nunavut legislature at its opening, Queen Elizabeth II stated: "I am proud to be the first member of the Canadian royal family to be greeted in Canada's newest territory." Princess Anne used it again when speaking at Rideau Hall in 2014, as did the now King Charles in Halifax the same year. Also in 2014, Premier of Saskatchewan Brad Wall called Prince Edward a member of the Canadian royal family. By 2011, both Canadian and British media were referring to "Canada's royal family" or the "Canadian royal family".

While Heard observed in 2018 that no direct legal action has, so far, created a Canadian royal family, he also asserted that the Canadian Heraldic Authority creating uniquely Canadian standards for members of the royal family other than the monarch was a symbolic "localization of the royal family"; Sean Palmer agreed, stating the banners are a sign the country has taken "'ownership' not only of the Queen of Canada, but of the other members of her family as well" and that doing so was another formal affirmation of the concept of a Canadian royal family "as distinct as the Queen of Canada is from the Queen of the United Kingdom". Jai Patel and Sally Raudon also noted, in 2019, that the purpose of these heraldic banners was to recognize the owners' roles as members of the Canadian royal family.

== Federal residences and royal household ==
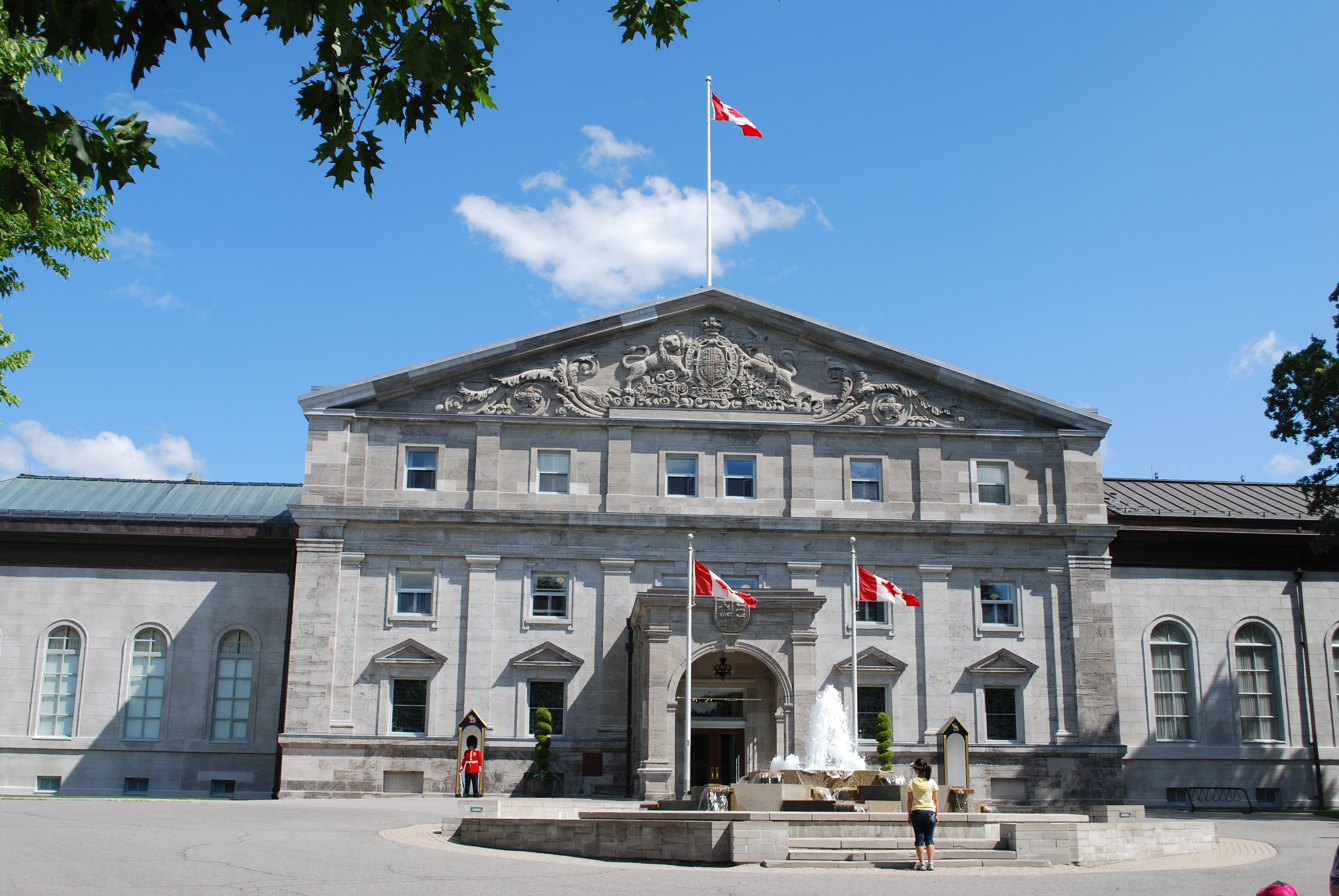
Rideau Hall

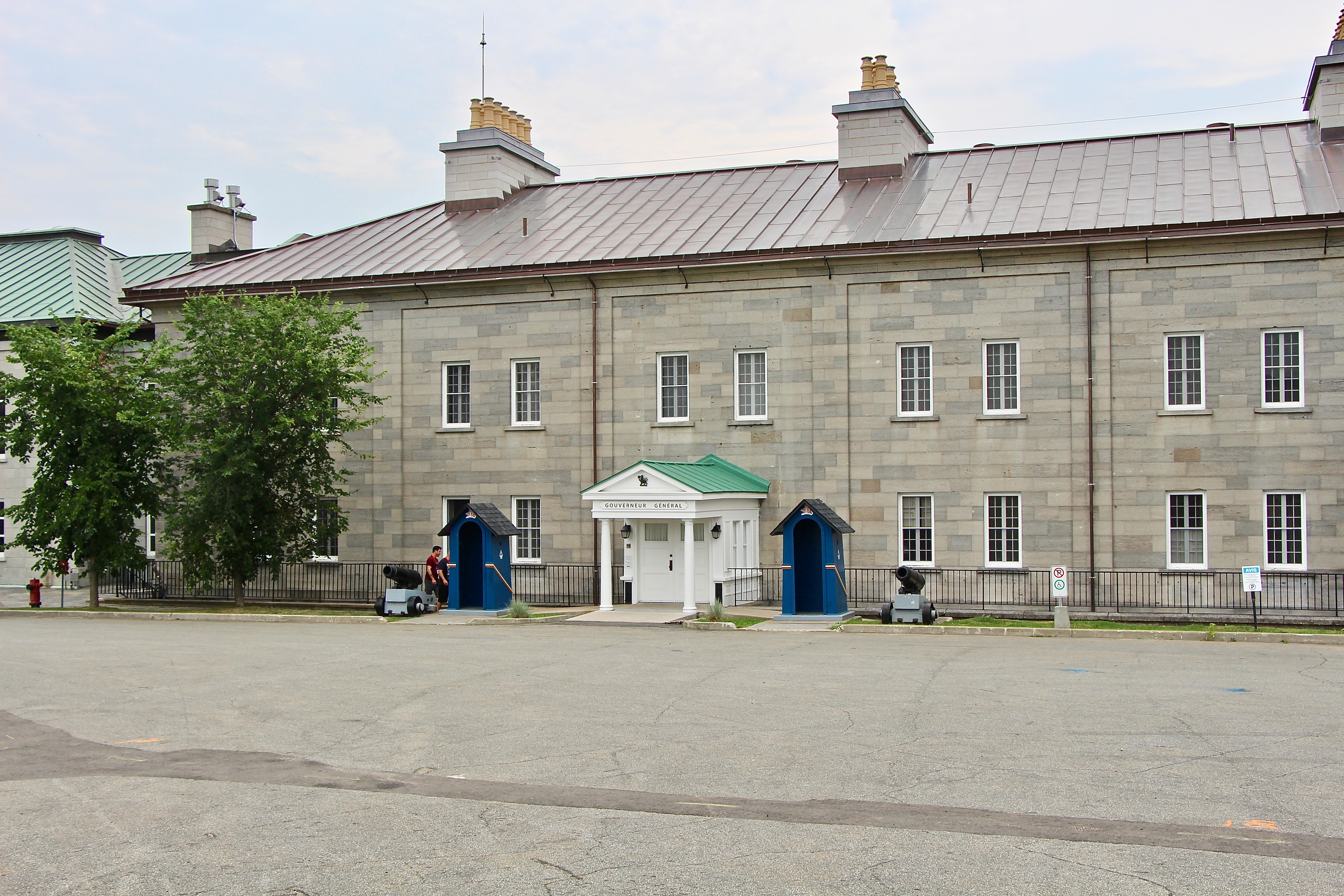
Citadelle of Quebec

Official residences of the sovereign and their representative, the governor general

Buildings across Canada reserved by the Crown for the use of the monarch and his viceroys are called Government House, but may be customarily known by some specific name. The sovereign's and governor general's official residences are Rideau Hall in Ottawa and the Citadelle in Quebec City. (Note: While the government houses are the King's official residences in Canada, they are almost exclusively occupied by the sovereign's representative in each of those jurisdictions.) Each holds pieces from the Crown Collection. Though neither was used for their intended purpose, Hatley Castle in British Columbia was purchased in 1940 by the federal government for the use of George VI and his family during the Second World War and the Emergency Government Headquarters, built between 1959 and 1961 at CFS Carp and decommissioned in 1994, included a residential apartment for the sovereign or governor general in the case of a nuclear attack.

British royalty have also owned homes and land in Canada in a private capacity: Edward VIII owned Bedingfield Ranch, near Pekisko, Alberta; and Princess Margaret owned Portland Island, which was given to her by British Columbia in 1958. She offered it back to the province on permanent loan in 1961, which was accepted in 1966, and the island and surrounding waters eventually became Princess Margaret Marine Park.

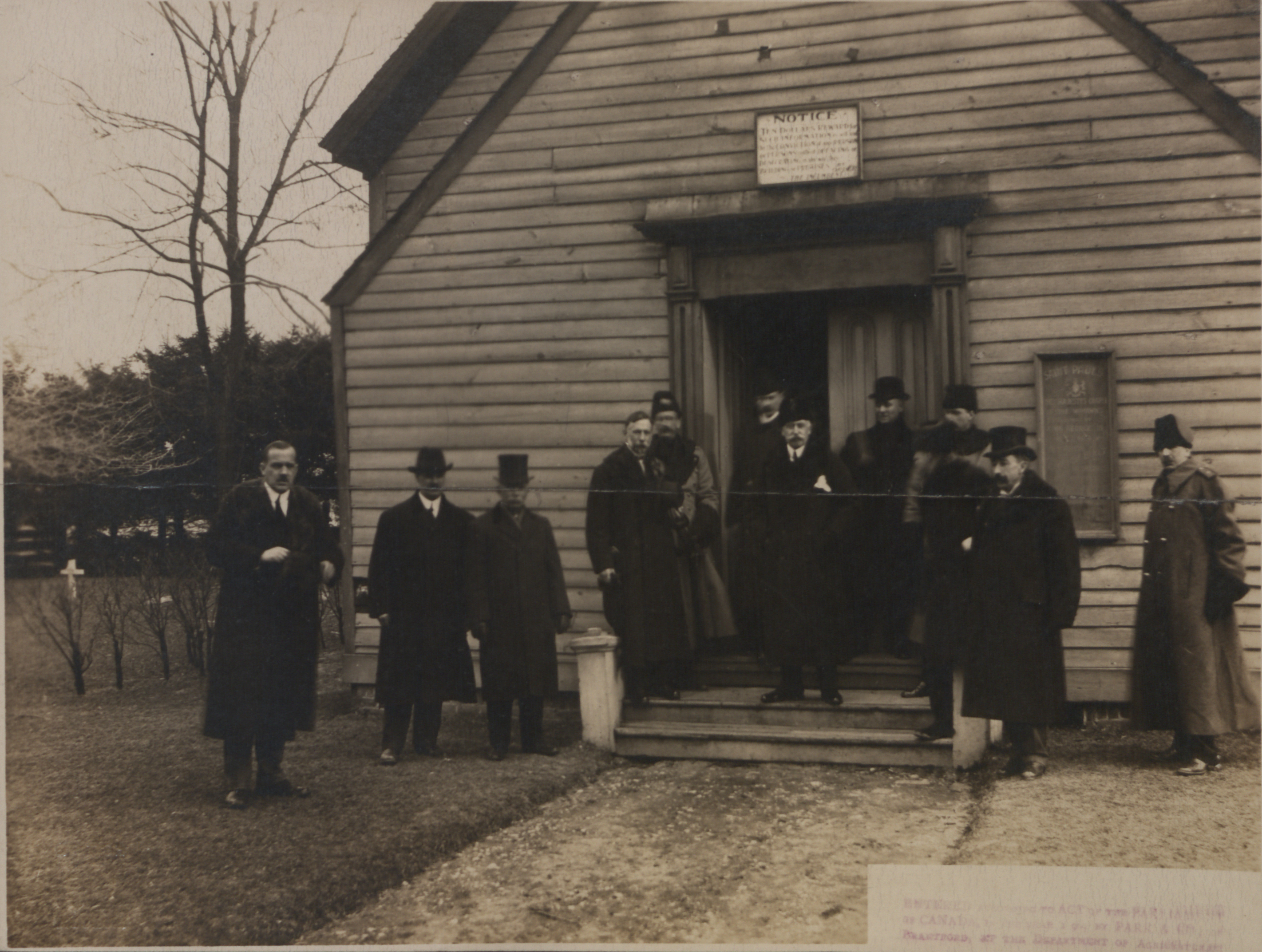
Prince Arthur at Mohawk Chapel in 1913. The sanctuary was designated a chapel royal in 1904.

In addition to a maître d'hôtel, chefs, footmen, valets, dressers, pages, aides-de-camp (drawn from the junior officers of the armed forces), equerries, and others at Rideau Hall, the King appoints various people to his Canadian household to assist him in carrying out his official duties on behalf of Canada. Along with the Canadian secretary to the King, the monarch's entourage includes the equerry-in-waiting to the King, the King's police officer, two ladies-in-waiting for the Queen, the King's honorary physician, the King's honorary dental surgeon, and the King's honorary nursing officer—the latter three being drawn from the Canadian Forces. Prince Edward, Duke of Edinburgh, also has a Canadian private secretary and his wife, Sophie, Duchess of Edinburgh, a lady-in-waiting. Royal Canadian Air Force VIP aircraft are provided by 412 Transport Squadron.

There are three household regiments specifically attached to the royal household—the Governor General's Foot Guards, the Governor General's Horse Guards, and the Canadian Grenadier Guards. There are also three chapels royal, all in Ontario: Mohawk Chapel in Brantford; Christ Church Royal Chapel, near Deseronto; and St Catherine's Chapel at Massey College, in Toronto. Though not a chapel royal, St Bartholomew's Anglican Church, located across MacKay Street from Rideau Hall, is regularly used by governors general and their families and sometimes by the sovereign and other visiting royalty, as well as by staff, their families, and members of the Governor General's Foot Guards, for whom the church serves as a regimental chapel.

=== Security ===
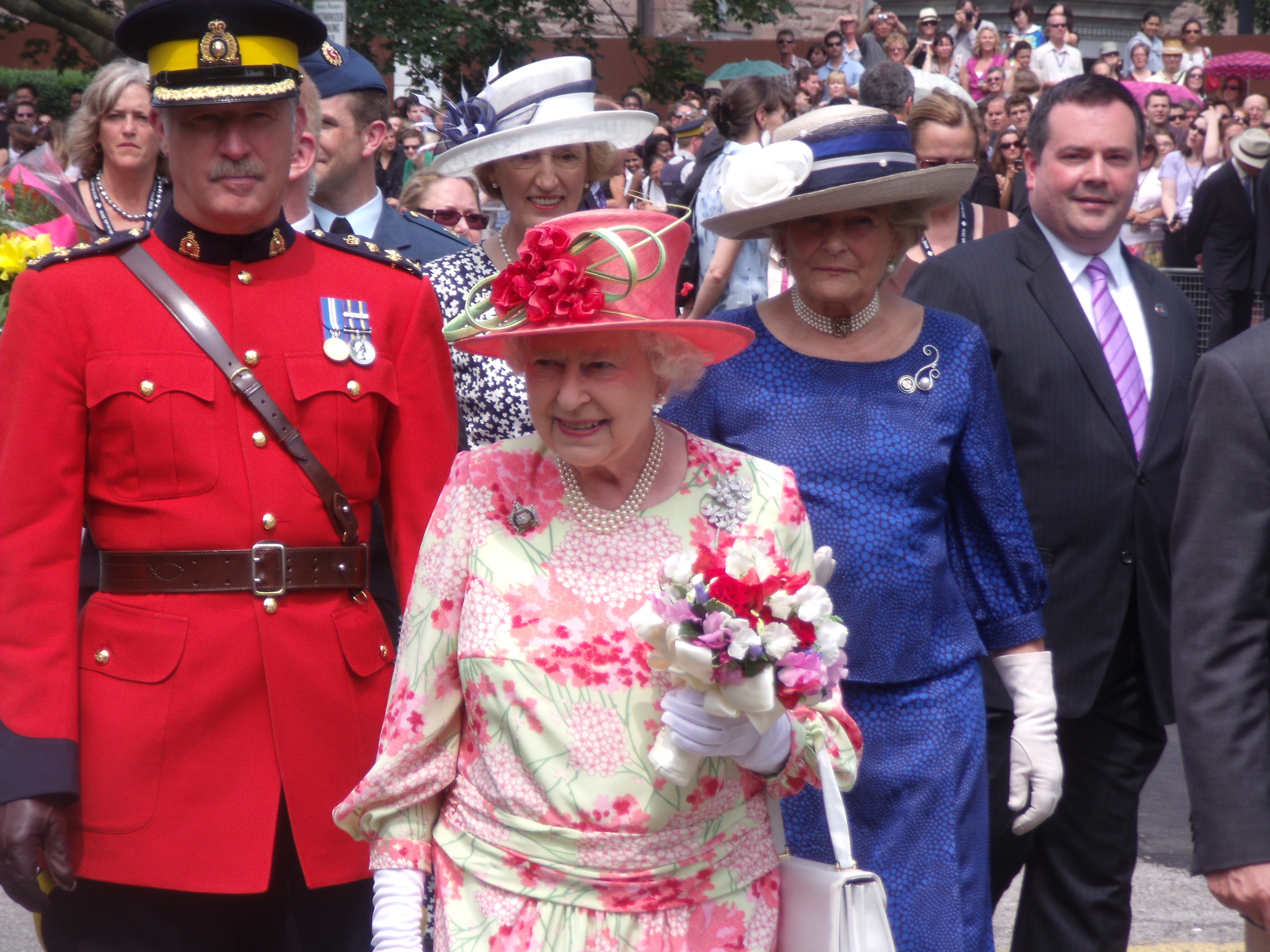
A Queen's Police Officer, drawn from the RCMP, with Elizabeth II in Toronto

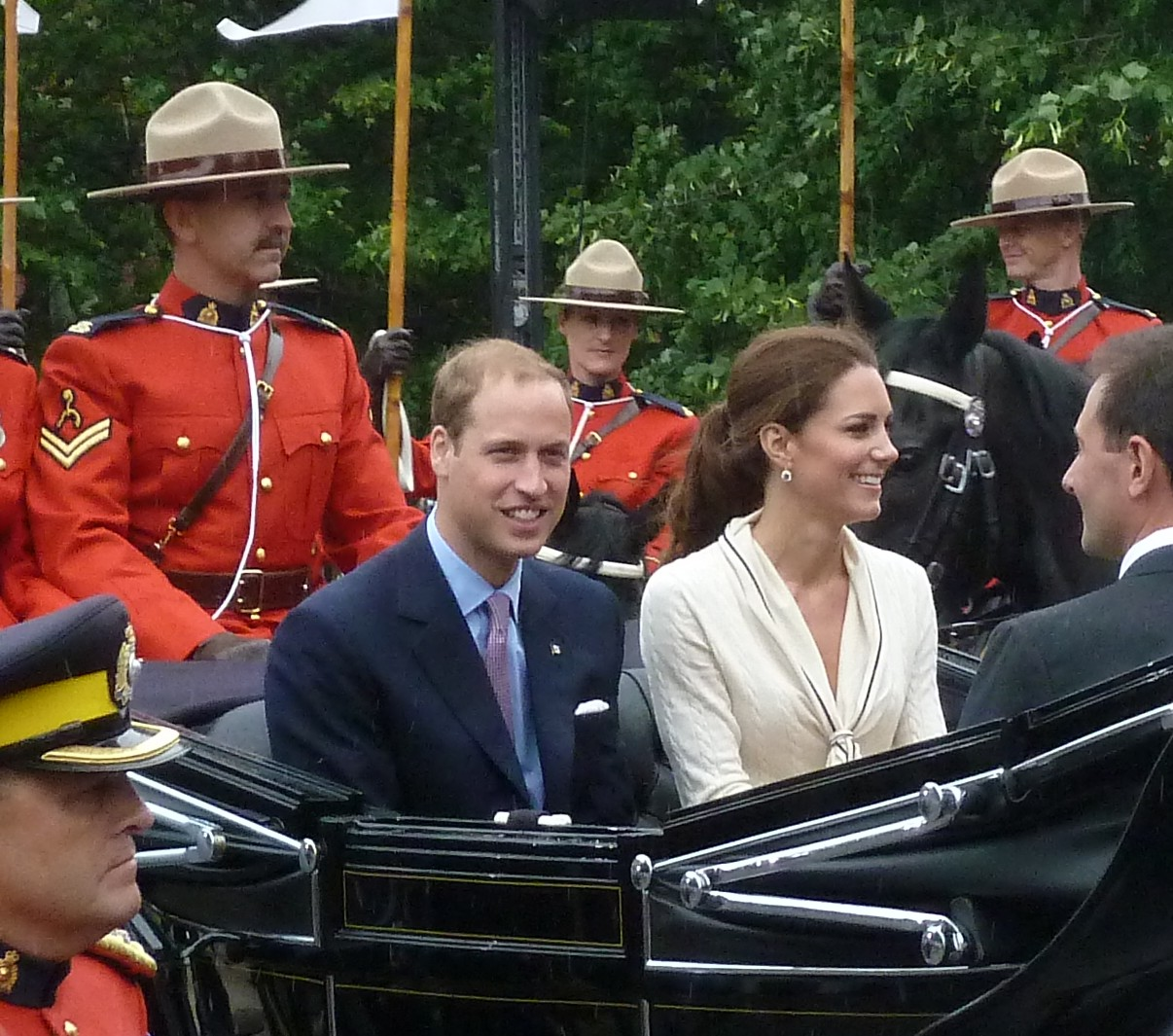
The Duke and Duchess of Cambridge with an RCMP escort, in Charlottetown

The Royal Canadian Mounted Police is tasked with providing security to the sovereign, the governor general (starting from when they are made governor general-designate), and other members of the royal family; as outlined in the RCMP Regulations, the force "has a duty to protect individuals designated by the minister of public safety, including certain members of the royal family when visiting." The RCMP's provision of service is determined based on threat and risk assessment, the seniority of the individual in terms of precedence and. (Note: For example, when the Duke and Duchess of Sussex resided for a time on Vancouver Island, as they were planning their future as members of the royal family, the RCMP provided the couple's security. However, when the Sussexes decided to step down as senior members of the royal family, the RCMP reassessed its provision of service. In a briefing note to the Minister of Public Safety, Bill Blair, the force noted, "the Sussex family's stay in Canada is of a private nature and, to date, there have been no official outings wherein the Duke and Duchess are representing the Queen. There is no indication of either the Duke or Duchess participating in any official capacity for the Crown in Canada in the next two months. Should this change, however, the RCMP will assess and provide security accordingly.") for members of the royal family, the nature of the royal tour—i.e. an official tour by the King or on behalf of the King or a working or private visit. The governor general receives round-the-clock security from the Governor General Protection Detail, part of the Personal Protection Group, based at Rideau Hall.

== History ==
=== From colonies to independence ===
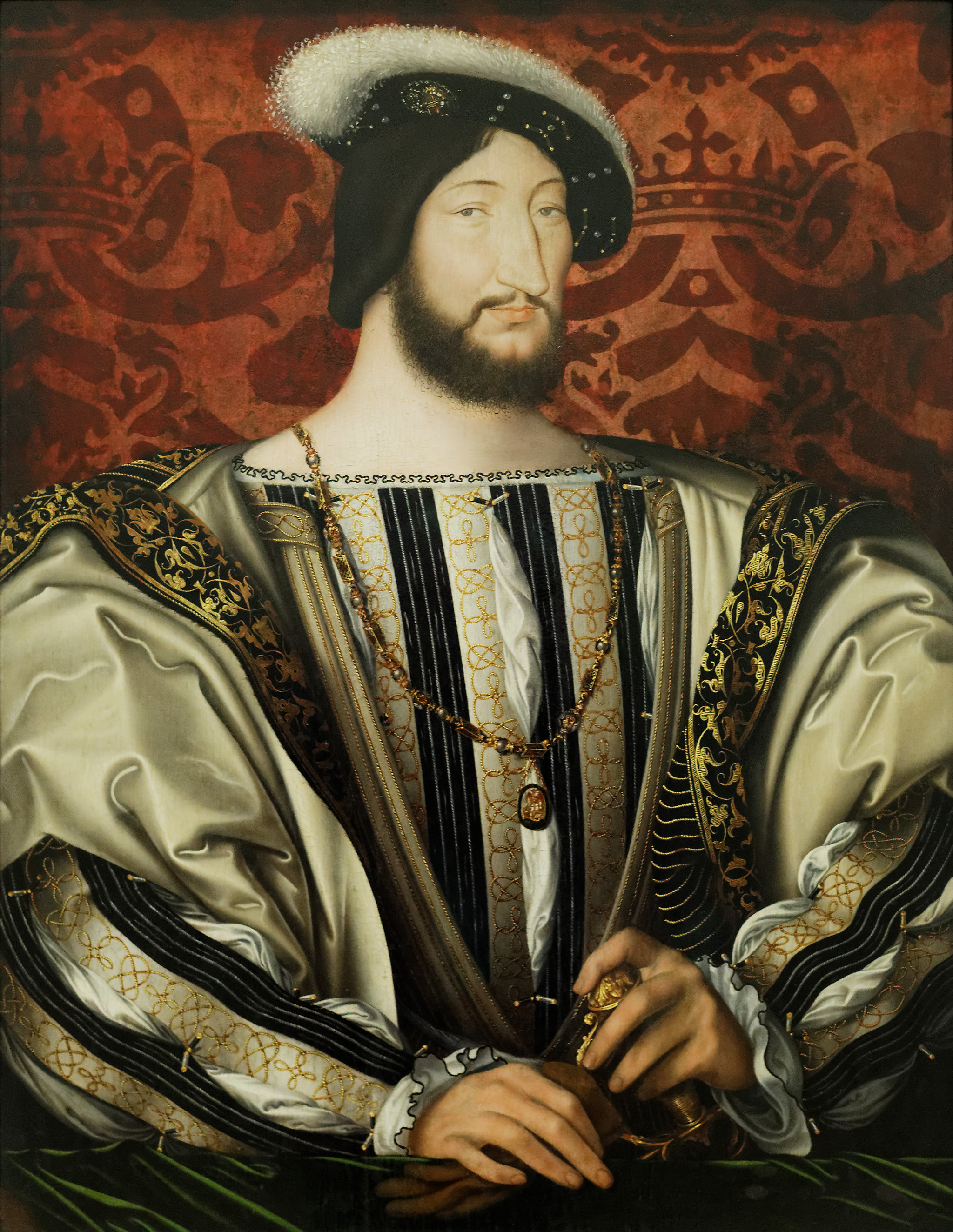
King Francis I of France established colonies in Acadia and Canada in 1534.

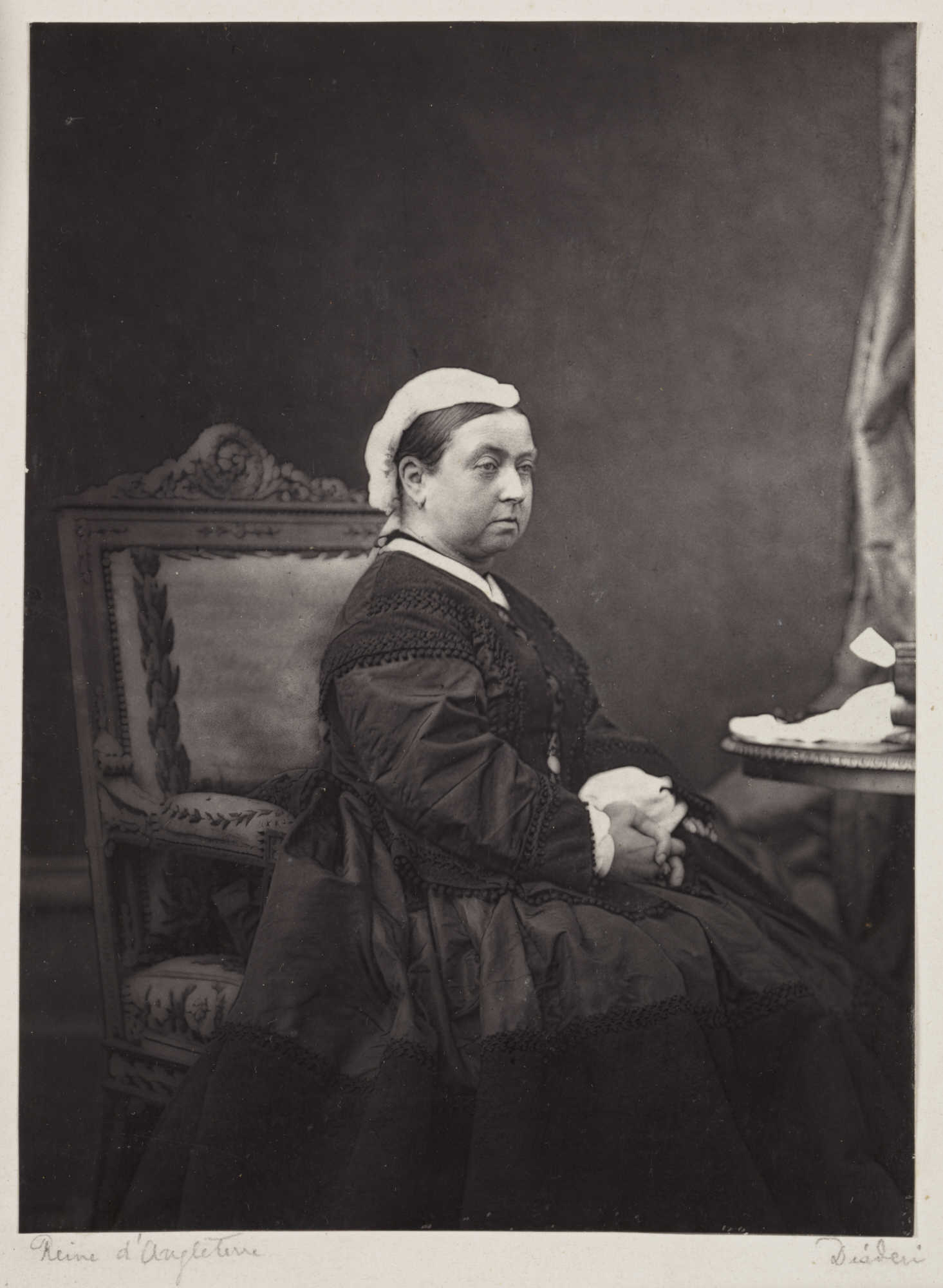
Queen Victoria in 1870, three years after her royal assent to the British North America Act, 1867, creating the Canadian federation

The Canadian monarchy can trace its ancestral lineage back to the kings of the Angles and the early Scottish kings and through the centuries since the claims of King Henry VII in 1497 and King Francis I in 1534; both being blood relatives of the current Canadian monarch. Former Prime Minister Stephen Harper said of the Crown that it "links us all together with the majestic past that takes us back to the Tudors, the Plantagenets, Magna Carta, habeas corpus, petition of rights, and English common law." Though the first French and British colonizers of Canada interpreted the hereditary nature of some indigenous North American chieftainships as a form of monarchy, it is generally accepted that Canada has been a territory of a monarch or a monarchy in its own right only since the establishment of the French colony of Canada in the early 16th century; according to historian Jacques Monet, the Canadian Crown is one of the few that have survived through uninterrupted succession since before its inception.

After the Canadian colonies of France were, via war and treaties, ceded to the British Crown, and the population was greatly expanded by those loyal to George III fleeing north from persecution during and following the American Revolution, British North America was in 1867 confederated by Queen Victoria to form Canada as a kingdom in its own right. By the end of the First World War, the increased fortitude of Canadian nationalism inspired the country's leaders to push for greater independence from the King in his British Council, resulting in the creation of the uniquely Canadian monarchy through the Statute of Westminster, which was granted royal assent in 1931. Only five years later, Canada had three successive kings in the space of one year, with the death of George V, the accession and abdication of Edward VIII, and his replacement by George VI.

From 1786 through to the 1930s, members of the royal family toured Canada, including Prince William (later King William IV); Prince Edward, Duke of Kent; Prince Albert Edward, Prince of Wales (later King Edward VII); Prince Arthur, Duke of Connaught and Strathearn; John Campbell, Marquess of Lorne, and Princess Louise; Prince Leopold; Princess Marie-Louise; Prince George, Duke of Cornwall and York (later King George V), and Princess Victoria (later Queen Mary); Prince Arthur (son of the Duke of Connaught); Princess Patricia; Prince Albert (later King George VI); Prince Edward, Prince of Wales (later King Edward VIII); Prince George, Duke of Kent; and Prince Henry, Duke of Gloucester.

=== The Canadian Crown ===
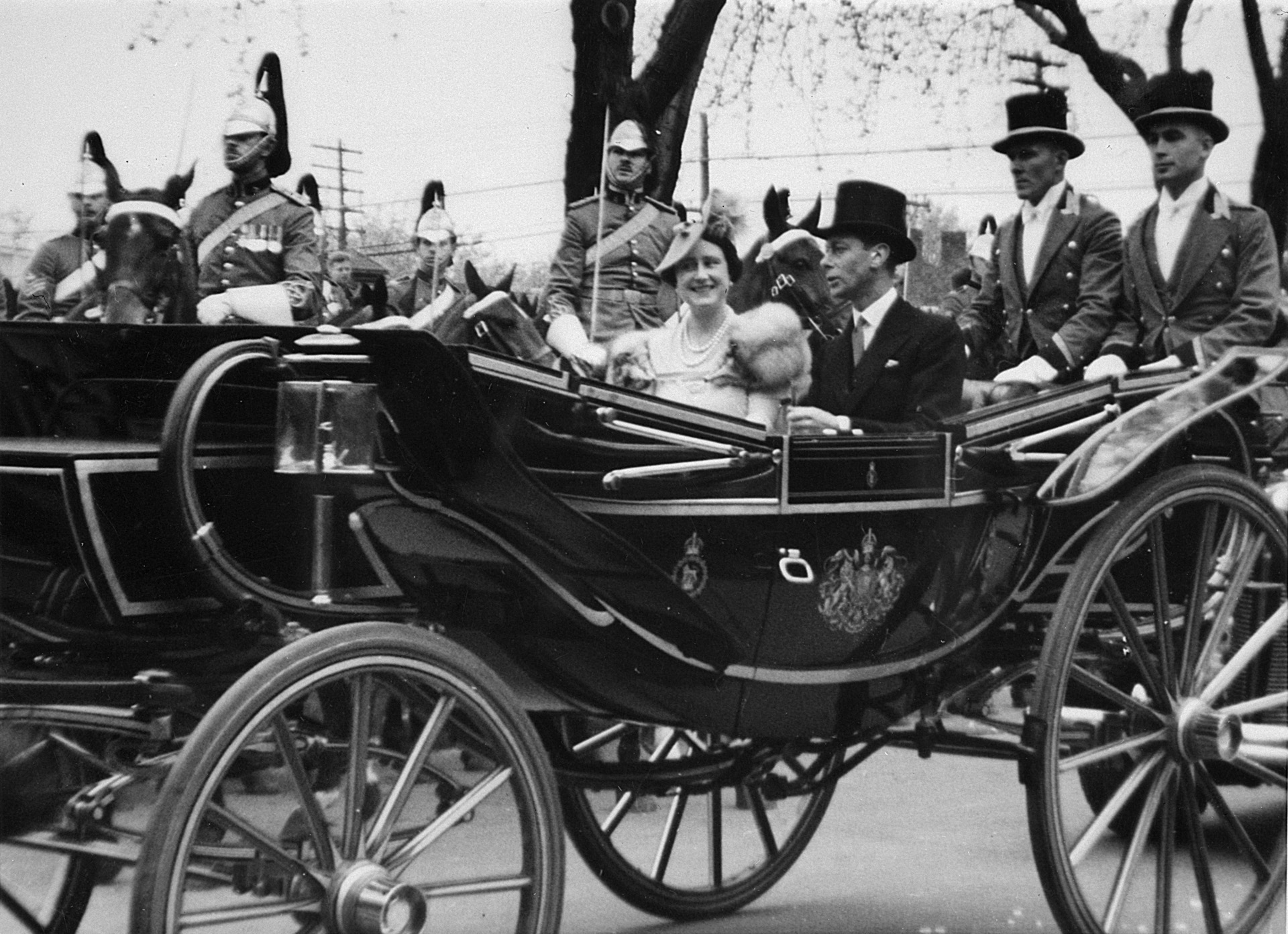
King George VI and Queen Elizabeth attending the King's Plate in Toronto during their 1939 royal tour

King George VI became in 1939 the first reigning monarch of Canada to tour the country, doing so with his wife, Queen Elizabeth. Only weeks later, the King, on the advice of his Canadian Prime Minister, declared war on Nazi Germany. Throughout the conflict, George boosted the morale of his Canadian troops while Governor General the Earl of Athlone (the King's uncle) supported the war effort in Canada. The men were occasionally assisted in their efforts by other members of the royal family.

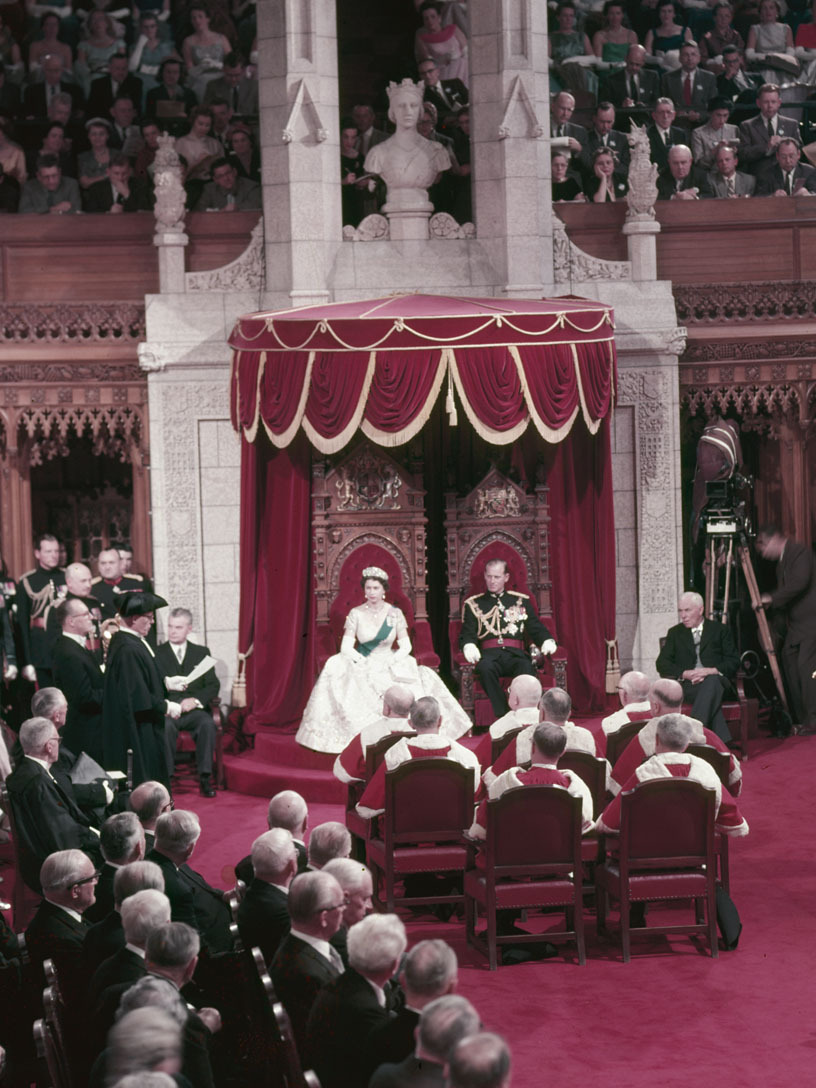
Queen Elizabeth II, wearing her coronation gown, with Prince Philip during the opening of the 23rd Canadian Parliament, October 1957

Elizabeth II undertook her first tour of Canada in 1951, when Princess Elizabeth, Duchess of Edinburgh. She would go on to officiate at various moments of importance in the nation's history: She opened Parliament in 1957—on the same tour, delivering, from Rideau Hall, her first-ever live television broadcast—and in 1977; opened the St. Lawrence Seaway in 1959; celebrated the Canadian Centennial; and proclaimed the country to be fully independent, via constitutional patriation, in 1982. That act is said to have entrenched the monarchy in Canada, due to the stringent amending formula that must be followed in order to alter the monarchy in any way.

Through the 1960s and 1970s, the rise of Quebec nationalism and changes in Canadian identity created an atmosphere where the purpose and role of the monarchy came into question. Some references to the monarch and the monarchy were removed from the public eye and moves were made by the federal government to constitutionally alter the Crown's place and role in Canada, first by explicit legal amendments and later by subtle attrition. But, provincial and federal ministers, along with loyal national citizen's organizations, ensured that the system remained the same in essence.

The Queen publicly expressed her personal support for the Meech Lake Accord, which attempted to bring Quebec governmental support to the patriated constitution. The accord failed, prompting Elizabeth to deliver a nationally-broadcast speech in Ottawa supporting Canadian unity. In the lead-up to the referendum on Quebec independence in 1995, the Queen was tricked by a Montreal radio DJ into revealing her desire to see the "no" side win, offering to help however she could. Elizabeth followed the results closely on the day of the vote.

Members of the royal family continued to be present at important national events through the decades: the Queen in 1970, 1971, and 1973, respectively, marked the anniversaries of Manitoba, British Columbia, and Prince Edward Island becoming Canadian provinces; celebrated Ontario's and New Brunswick's bicentennials in 1984 and the 125th anniversary of Confederation in 1992; and she opened the 1976 Summer Olympics in Montreal and Nunavut's parliament in 1999. Prince Charles, Prince of Wales, attended the 100th anniversary of Treaty 7 in 1977; commemorated in 1983 the bicentennial of United Empire Loyalists settling in New Brunswick and Nova Scotia; and, with Diana, Princess of Wales, opened Expo 86 in Vancouver. Between them, the Queen and her family opened numerous Commonwealth Games, Commonwealth Heads of Government Meetings, conferences, hospitals, community centres, and the like; handed out The Duke of Edinburgh Awards at ceremonies across the country, and visited many regiments and branches of the Canadian Armed Forces.

=== The 21st century ===
Elizabeth II, the first monarch to be titled Queen of Canada, wearing her Canadian insignia, as sovereign of the Order of Canada and the Order of Military Merit, 2010

By 2002, the royal tour and associated fêtes for the Queen's Golden Jubilee proved popular with Canadians across the country, though Canada's first republican organization since the 1830s was also founded that year. Celebrations took place across the country to mark the Queen's Diamond Jubilee in 2012, the first such event in Canada since that for Victoria in 1897. On 9 September 2015, she became the second-longest reigning monarch in Canadian history (preceded only by King Louis XIV); events were organized to celebrate her as the "longest-reigning sovereign in Canada's modern era." Prince Charles represented his mother, the Queen, two years later, at the main events in Ottawa recognizing the 150th anniversary of Confederation.

During the COVID-19 pandemic, the Queen expressed her support for all Canadians and thanks to those who were caring for the vulnerable and providing essential services. As the pandemic waned into 2022, celebrations were mounted around the country and throughout the year to mark the Queen's Platinum Jubilee; the first-ever such event in Canadian history. It was also, though, the first time since at least Queen Victoria's Golden Jubilee in 1887 that the federal Cabinet did not advise the Crown to create an associated medal. In response, six provinces produced their own Platinum Jubilee medals; another first.

The subject of reconciliation with Canada's Indigenous peoples came to the forefront of the public consciousness in 2021, particularly in regard to residential schools. Statues of Queen Victoria and Queen Elizabeth II in Winnipeg were vandalized. On the first National Day for Truth and Reconciliation, Elizabeth made a public statement, saying she "joins with all Canadians [...] to reflect on the painful history that Indigenous peoples endured in residential schools in Canada and on the work that remains to heal and to continue to build an inclusive society." In the same year, the Queen appointed Mary Simon as the first Indigenous governor general in Canadian history. (Note: Indigenous persons had already been appointed as lieutenant governors during Elizabeth's reign.) During Charles's tour for his mother's Platinum Jubilee, the BBC's royal correspondent observed that "there [was] no shying away from acknowledging and highlighting the scandalous way many indigenous peoples have been treated in Canada."

Queen Elizabeth II died on 8 September 2022 and was succeeded by her eldest son, Charles III. The Queen's final public statement was issued on 7 September, in the aftermath of the 2022 Saskatchewan stabbings, stating she "mourn[s] with all Canadians at this tragic time." Elizabeth reigned for almost half of Canada's history since Confederation, being only the sixth Canadian monarch since 1867.

The Crown has for so long been a symbol of unity for Canada. It also represents stability and continuity from the past to the present. As it should, it stands proudly as a symbol of Canada today, in all her richness and dynamism.

— Charles III, Speech from the Throne, 2025

Immediately following a formal meeting of the King's Privy Council for Canada, the new king was proclaimed on 10 September in a ceremony at Rideau Hall. On 4 May 2023, the King held audiences with Simon and Indigenous leaders, who also attended his coronation two days later.

In May 2025, King Charles III, accompanied by Queen Camilla, visited Canada for the first time as monarch and delivered the speech from the throne, the first time a Canadian monarch has done so in person since 1977.

== Public perception and understanding ==
King Charles III delivering the 2025 Speech from the Throne in the Senate of Canada Building, May 2025

Prior to the 1970s, Canadians' view of the monarchy was more focused on the person of the monarch than the institution's place in the country's framework. Smith, in 2017, and Jackson, in 2018, observed the shift continuing, especially as "the process of 'Canadianization' of the Crown picked up momentum in the early 21st century."

Still, beginning in the later decades of the 20th century, commentators stated that contemporary Canadians had and have a poor understanding of the Canadian monarchy; something the Monarchist League of Canada (MLC) claims opponents of the monarchy exacerbate by spreading disinformation and then take advantage of. Jackson wrote in his book, The Crown and Canadian Federalism, that this is part of a wider ignorance about Canadian civics and Hugo Cyr agreed, while Smith researched for his 1995 book, The Invisible Crown, he found it difficult to "find anyone who could talk knowledgeably about the subject". Former Governors General Clarkson and Johnston made similar observations and Senator Lowell Murray wrote in 2003, "the Crown has become irrelevant to most Canadians' understanding of our system of government", which he attributed to the "fault of successive generations of politicians, of an educational system that has never given the institution due study, and of past viceregal incumbents themselves".

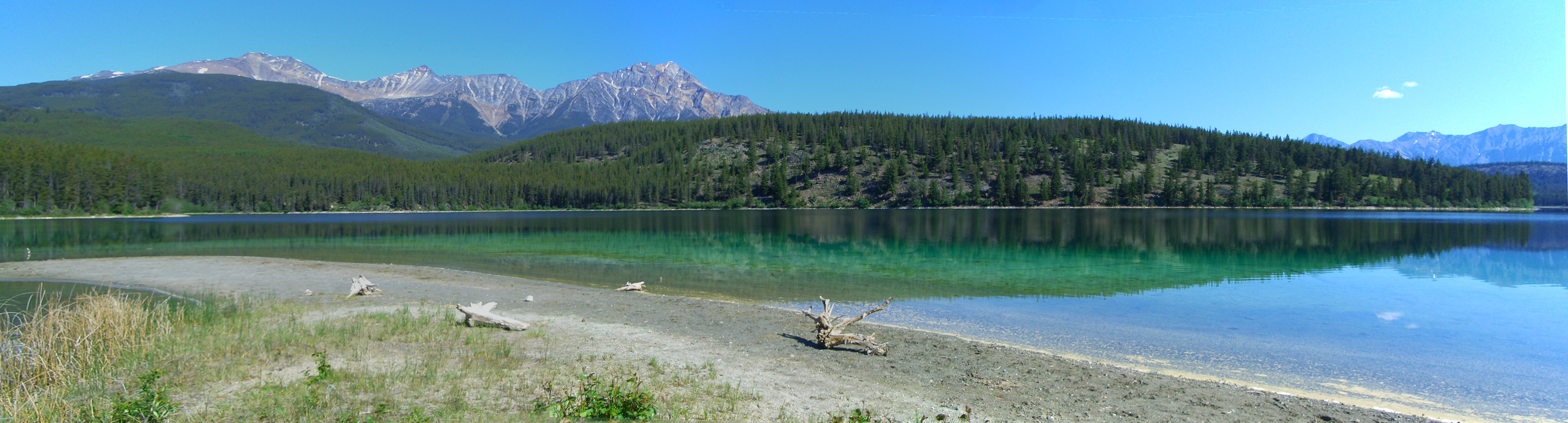
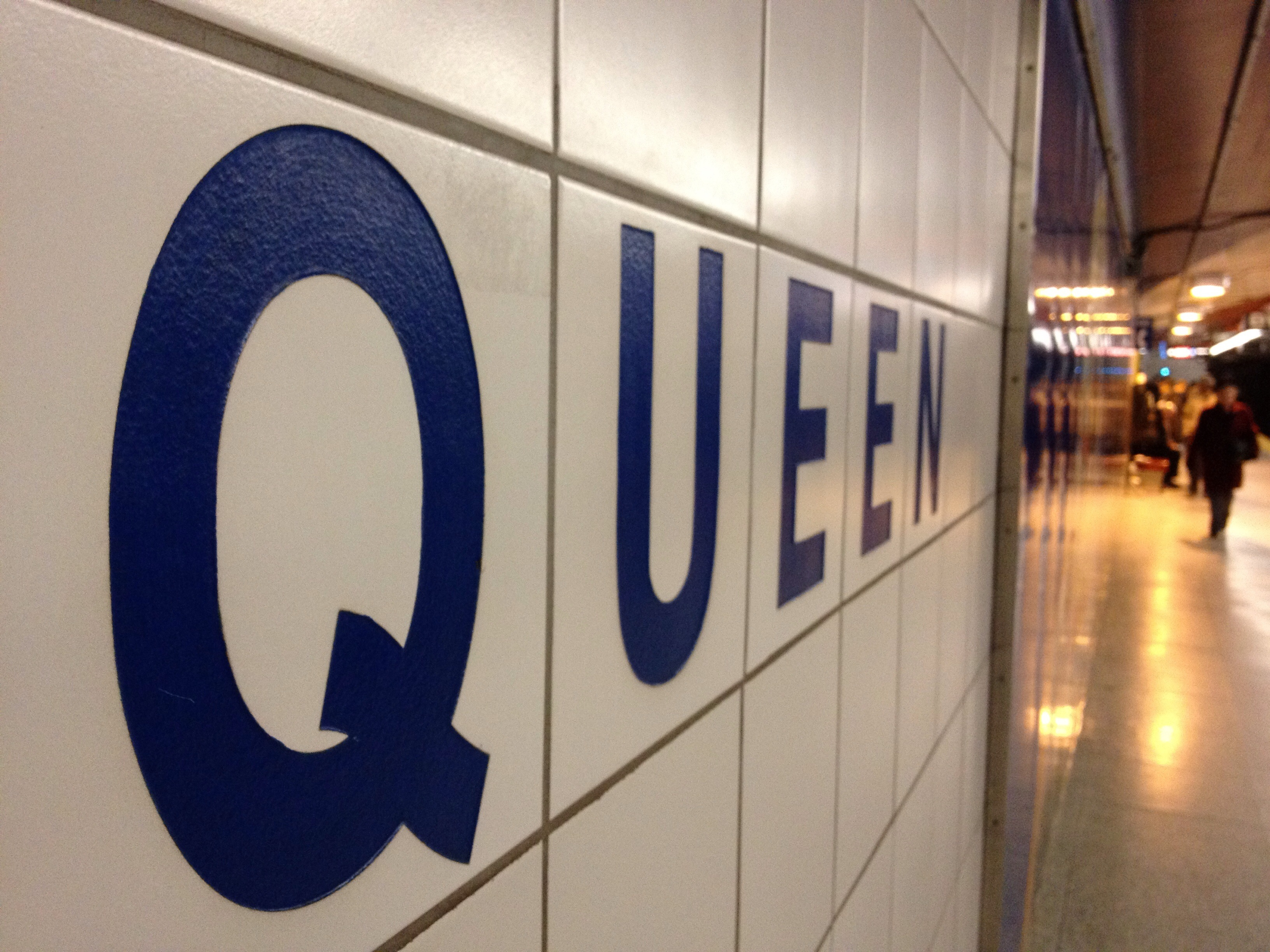
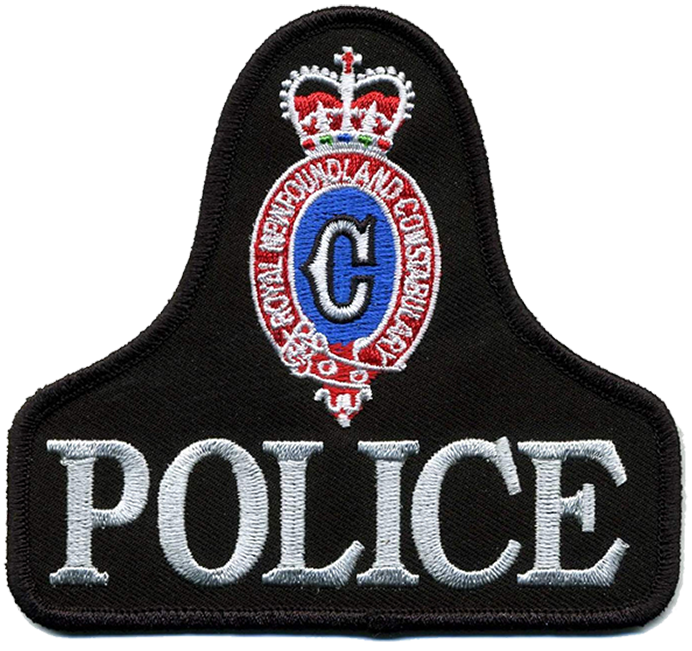
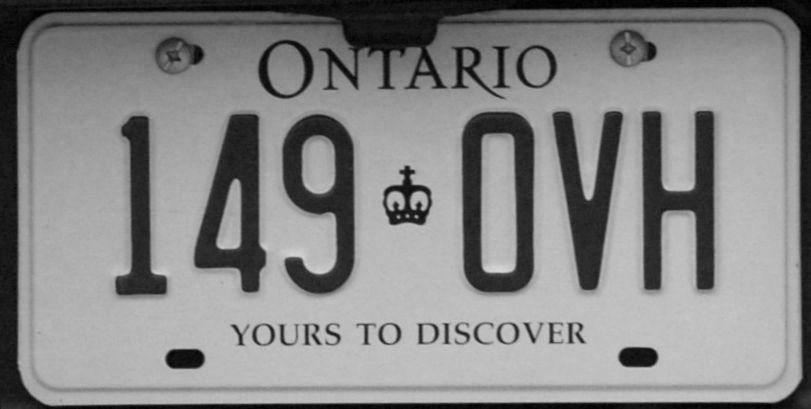
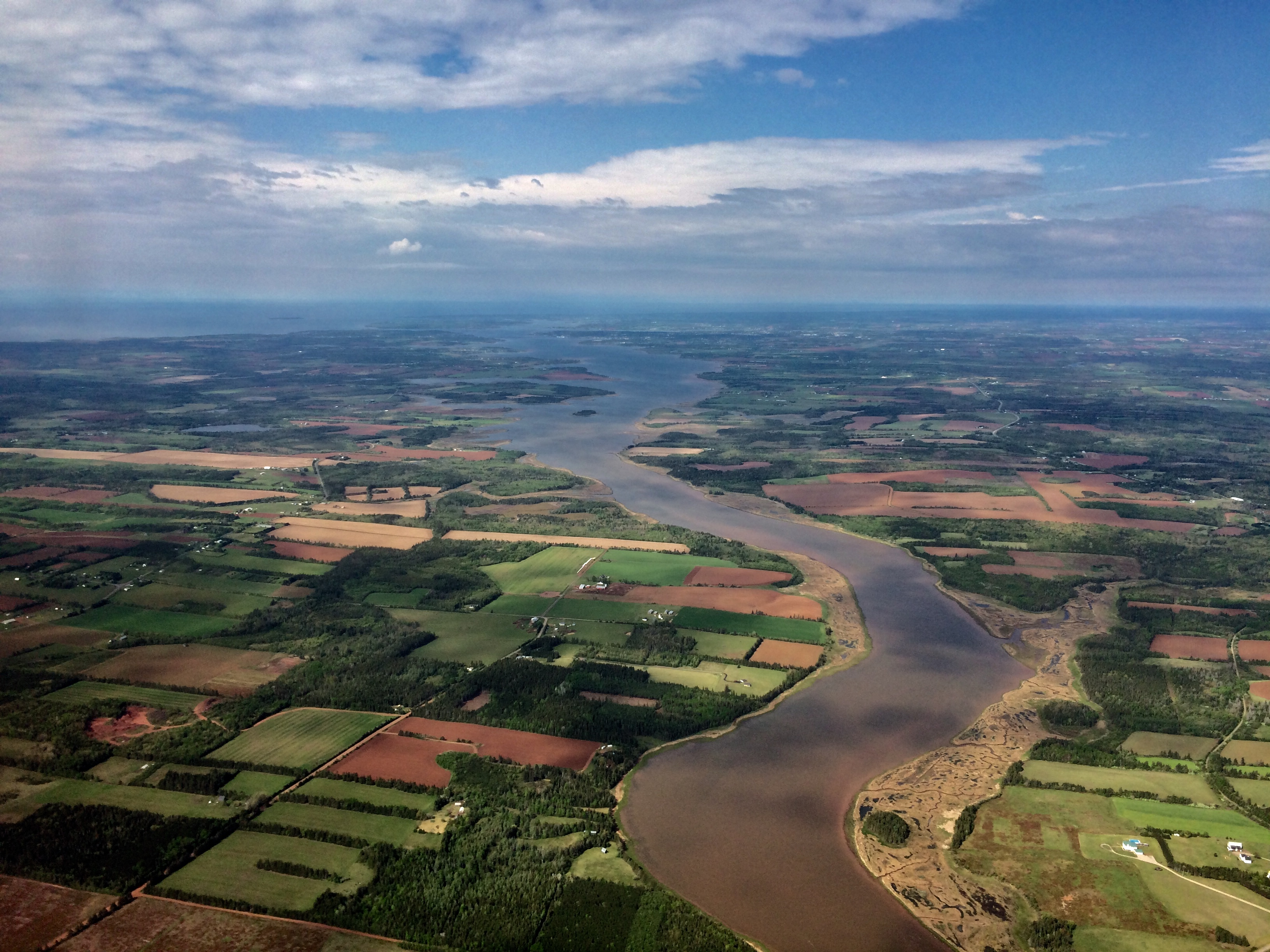
Examples of the prevalence of royal references and images around Canada (from top): Patricia Lake, named for Princess Patricia of Connaught; Queen station beneath Toronto's Queen Street, so named for Queen Victoria; badge of the Royal Newfoundland Constabulary; Ontario vehicle licence plate showing the silhouette of a crown; Prince Edward Island, named for Prince Edward, Duke of Kent and Strathearn; burgee of the Royal Vancouver Yacht Club

On education, teacher and author Nathan Tidridge asserted that, beginning in the 1960s, the role of the Crown disappeared from provincial education curricula, as the general subject of civics came to receive less attention. He said Canadians are being "educated to be illiterate, ambivalent, or even hostile toward our constitutional monarchy". The MLC agreed, stating Canada has "an educational system which unfortunately often fails to provide comprehensive knowledge of Canada's constitution."

Michael Valpy also pointed to the fact that "the Crown's role in the machinery of Canada's constitutional monarchy rarely sees daylight. Only a handful of times in our history has it been subjected to glaring sunshine, unfortunately resulting in a black hole of public understanding as to how it works." He later iterated, "the public's attention span on the constitutional intricacies of the monarchy is clinically short". At the same time, it has been theorized the monarchy is so prevalent in Canada—by way of all manner of symbols, place names, royal tours, etcetera—that Canadians fail to take note of it; the monarchy "functions like a tasteful wallpaper pattern in Canada: enjoyable in an absent-minded way, but so ubiquitous as to be almost invisible".

John Pepall argued in 1990 that, among all this, a "Liberal-inspired republican misconception of the role" of governor general had taken root, though the Conservative government headed by Brian Mulroney exacerbated the matter. The position of prime minister has simultaneously undergone, with encouragement from its occupants, what has been described as a "presidentialization", to the point that its incumbents publicly outshine the actual head of state. David S. Donovan felt Canadians mostly consider the monarch and her representatives as purely ceremonial and symbolic figures, while also still viewing the sovereign as British, even if they understand he is King of Canada. It was argued by Alfred Neitsch that this undermined the Crown's legitimacy as a check and balance in the governmental system, a situation Helen Forsey (daughter of Canadian constitutional expert Eugene Forsey) said prime ministers take advantage of, portraying themselves as the embodiment of popular democracy and the reserve powers of the Crown as illegitimate. The issue is particularly acute in Quebec, where sovereigntist politicians consider the Canadian monarchy as British, foreign, and, consequently, as symbol of oppression.

Beginning slightly earlier, a "growing interest in the Crown and its prerogatives" was observed, as evidenced by "a burst of articles, books and conferences"; the monarchy attracted increased attention from academics, as well as those involved with the law, government, and public policy. This was attributed to the coincidental occurrence of publicly prominent events over a number of years, including the 2008 prorogation dispute; an increased use of royal symbols as directed by the Cabinet while headed by Stephen Harper, including three consecutive royal tours; court cases focusing on the Oath of Citizenship; and increasingly active governors. Smith and Lagassé noted in early 2016 that post-secondary students were giving more focus to the subject of the Crown.

Some Canadians have taken the opposite extreme view of the Crown's powers, such as when, in 2013, the leader of the Green Party of Canada, Elizabeth May, wrote to Queen Elizabeth II asking her to call a "royal inquiry" to "investigate what may potentially be criminal activities which [sic] influenced Canada's last election" and "restore Canada to a free and fair democracy." The monarch's secretary instructed May, "as a constitutional sovereign, Her Majesty acts through her personal representative, the Governor-General, on the advice of her Canadian ministers and it is to them that your appeal should be directed." So many protesters involved in the 2022 Freedom Convoy called and emailed the office of Governor General Mary Simon to pressure her into dismissing her Prime Minister, Justin Trudeau, or dissolving Parliament that Simon made a rare public statement on the role of the governor general. Lagassé pointed to that as "evidence of a recent trend in protest movements", saying, "it has become routine in Canadian politics to write a letter to the Queen, Governor General, or a lieutenant governor asking them to exercise their powers in some way, contrary to constitutional conventions. This is political theatre, no more."

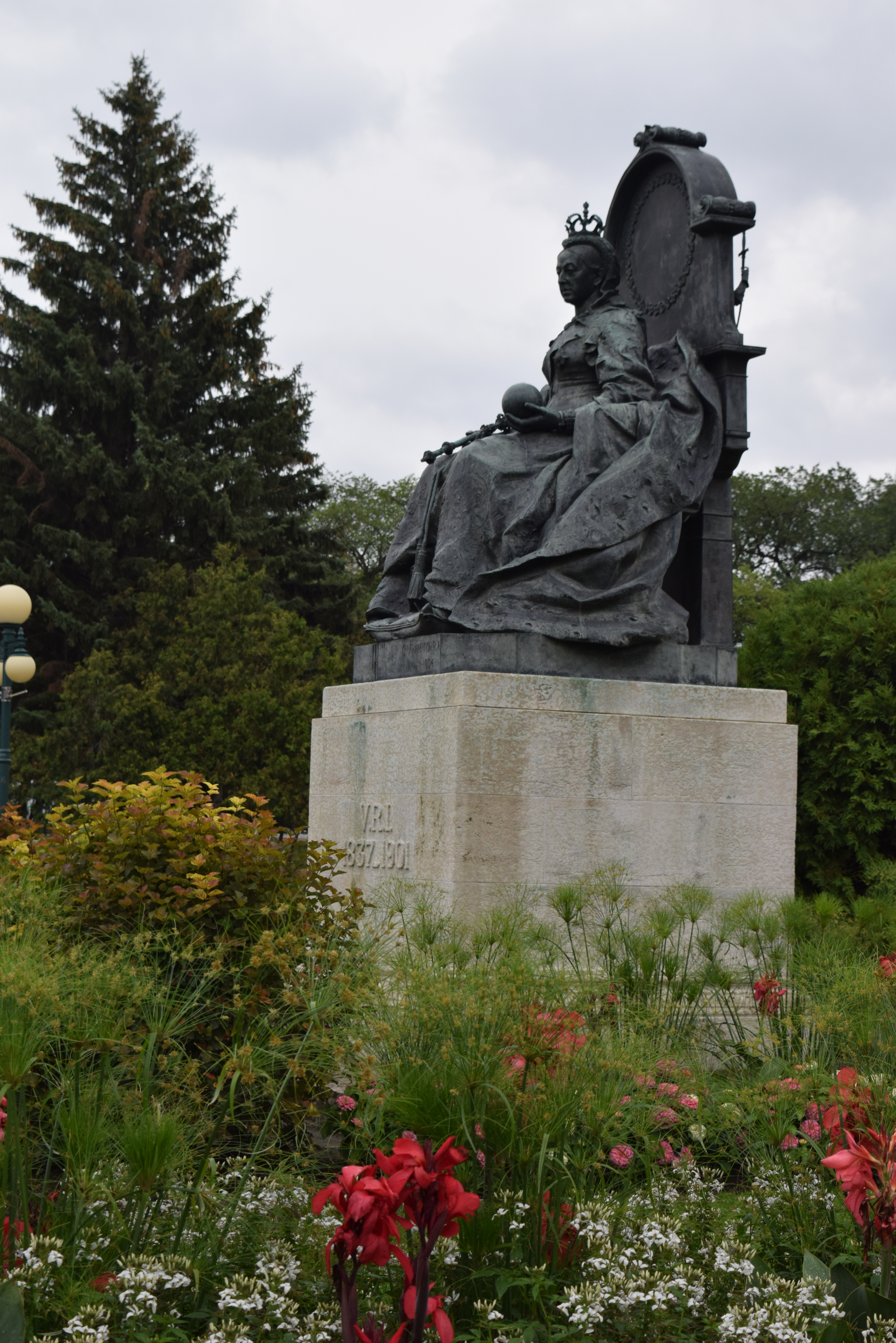
The statue of Queen Victoria at the Manitoba Legislative Building that was destroyed by protesters on Canada Day, 2021

The relationship between Canada's Indigenous peoples and the monarch remains unchanged, aside from the issue of reconciliation arising in it through the late 2010s into the 2020s, when there were some assertions by activists and in the media that the monarchy and the Queen herself represented colonialism and racism and she did not do enough to either prevent or rectify supposed offences. Those who made such claims also, though, mistook the independent Canadian Crown as the British Crown in Canada and demonstrated a misunderstanding of the Crown-Indigenous peoples relationship and the workings of constitutional monarchy and responsible government, in which the sovereign must, outside of constitutional crises, follow the directions of their ministers and parliamentarians. The leader of the Parti Québécois, Paul St-Pierre Plamondon, claimed in 2022, "we cannot overlook that she [Queen Elizabeth II] represented an institution, the British Crown, that has caused significant harm to Quebecers and Indigenous nations."

Within Quebec, too, the Canadian Crown is often depicted as being synonymous with the British Crown, with Quebec sovereigntists arguing that it is fundamentally foreign to Quebec and should be abolished within the province as a part of Quebec independence. For instance, in the televised Radio-Canada leaders' debate on 22 September 2022, during that year's general election in the province, the moderator, Patrice Roy, asked the panel, with "incredulous chuckles", "should we still, in Quebec, swear allegiance to the British Crown, thus Charles III [to take one's seat in the National Assembly]?" Bloc Québécois leader Yves-François Blanchet on 26 October 2022 tabled a motion in the House of Commons proposing that the "House express its desire to sever ties between the Canadian state and the British monarchy." This motion was defeated 266 to 44.

== Debate ==
The position of monarch in Canada is highly protected by the Constitution Act, 1982—which mandates that any major constitutional amendment, such as any change to the monarchy, must receive the consent of the Senate, the House of Commons, and all ten provincial legislative assemblies. Abolishing the monarchy may also be complicated by the fact that First Nations treaties are officially between the Crown and Indigenous peoples. (Note: Lagassé said, "you would need to have Indigenous peoples involved and consulted properly as well, in particular, since their treaty rights are understood to flow from treaties with the Crown.")

Prince Edward, Earl of Wessex, speaks with members of the Monarchist League of Canada at a League reception held at the Spoke Club in Toronto

Canada has two special-interest groups representing the debate, who occasionally argue the issue in the media: the Monarchist League of Canada (MLC) and Citizens for a Canadian Republic. There are also other organizations that support and advocate the monarchy, such as the Institute for the Study of the Crown in Canada, the Canadian Royal Heritage Trust, the Friends of the Canadian Crown, Canadian Friends of the Royal Family, the Société de la Couronne du Canada, the Orange Order in Canada, and the United Empire Loyalists' Association of Canada.

Out of Canada's four most prominent political parties, neither the Liberal Party nor the Conservative Party are officially in favour of abolishing the monarchy (the Conservative Party cite support for constitutional monarchy as a founding principle in its policy declaration) and the New Democratic Party has no official position on the role of the Crown. Only some individual members of Parliament belonging to these parties and the leaders of the Bloc Québécois party have made any statements suggesting abolition of the monarchy.

Opinion polls on the Canadian monarchy have been regularly conducted since the 1990s. An analysis of these polls in 2008 highlighted an increased disaffection with the monarchy, albeit with internal contradictions in specific polling results, with some criticizing the polling questions for using "inconsistent and sometimes ambiguous wording." Questions often describe the monarch or monarchy as "British", terminology at odds with the contemporary situation in Canada, wherein the monarchy is a Canadian institution, separate from that of the United Kingdom, and it, the Crown, and royal family are referred to as Canadian. Both monarchists and republicans agree the populace's general lack of understanding about the monarchy affects opinions.

The idea of a uniquely Canadian monarch, either one descended from the House of Windsor or coming from a First Nations royal house, has been proffered as an alternative. However, there has been no popular or official support for such a change.

== See also ==
Monarchy by provinces
- List of monarchies
- Monarchies in the Americas
- Royal and viceroyal transport in Canada
- Royal eponyms in Canada
- List of sovereign states headed by Elizabeth II
