= King's Guard =

Military units charged with protecting the royal residences of the United Kingdom

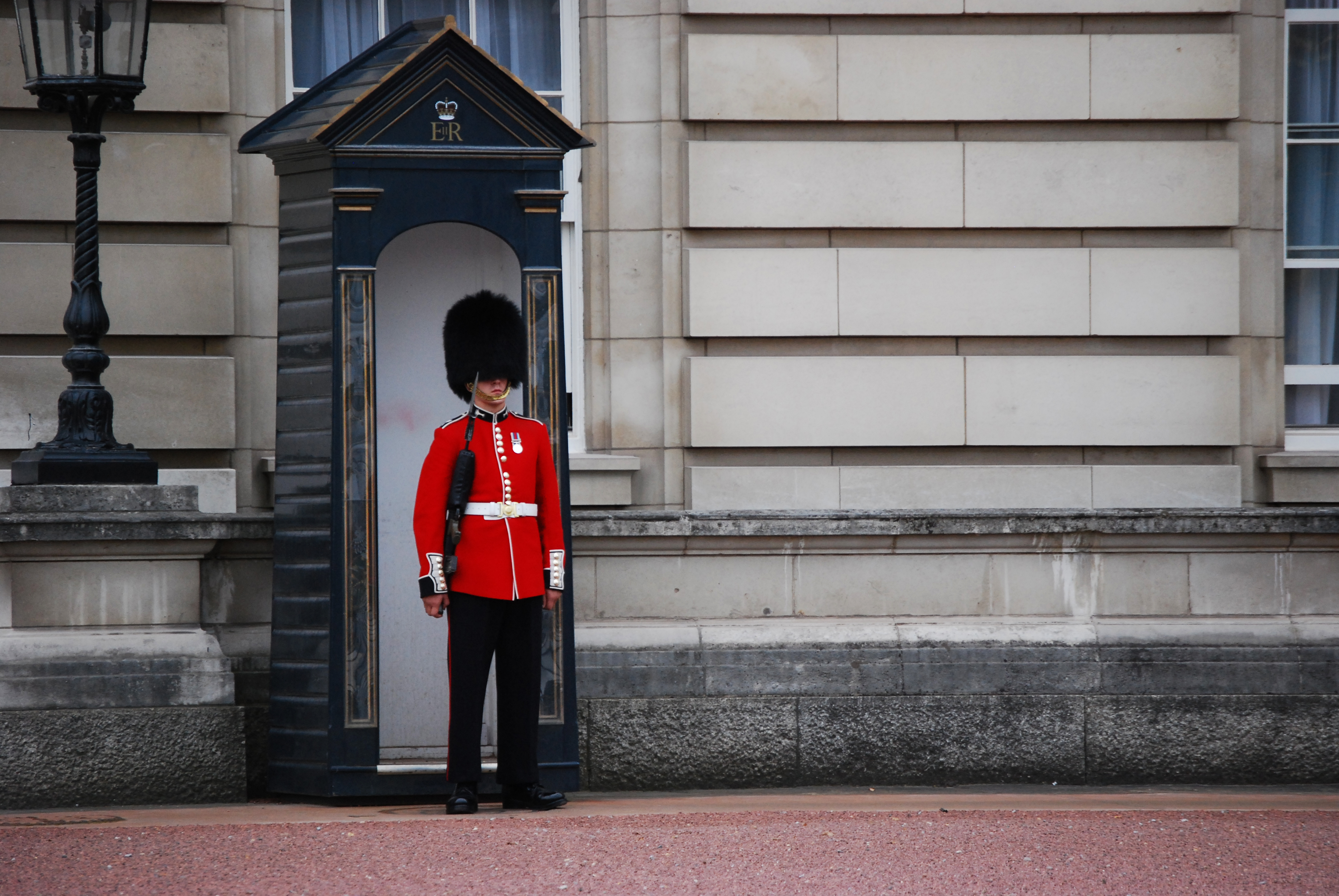
A guardsman staffs a sentry postings at Buckingham Palace known as the King's Guards.

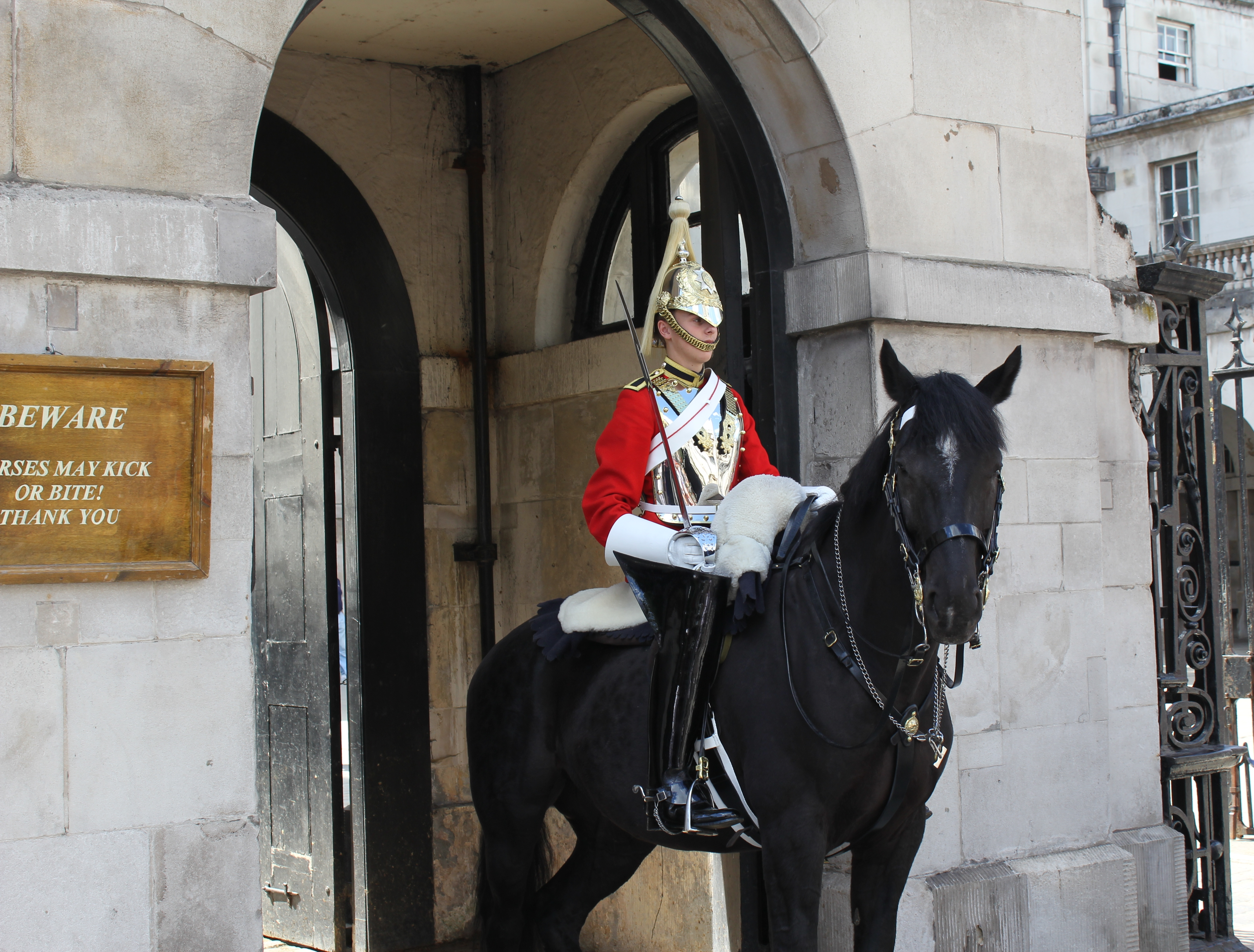
A trooper staffs a sentry posting at Horse Guards known as the King's Life Guard.

The King's Guard (called Queen's Guard and Queens's Life Guard when the reigning monarch is female) are sentry postings at Buckingham Palace and St James's Palace, organised by the British Army's Household Division. The Household Division also mounts sentry postings at Horse Guards, known as the King's Life Guard.

An infantry contingent, typically one of the Household Division's five regiments of foot guards, mounts the King's Guard, while the King's Life Guard is usually provided for by the Household Cavalry Mounted Regiment. Since the 20th century, several other British Army units, Royal Air Force units, Royal Navy units, and military units from other Commonwealth countries have been invited to form the King's Guard.

In addition to the King's Guard, the Household Division also provide for several other sentry postings including the Tower of London Guard and the Windsor Castle Guard. Several sentry postings are also occasionally mounted at the Palace of Holyroodhouse, the sovereign's residence in Edinburgh. Although the Household Division considers these other sentry posts as distinct postings from the King's Guard, colloquially, these postings have also been called the "King's Guard".

== Origin ==
Household troops have guarded the monarch's residences since the Stuart Restoration in 1660. The King's Guard maintained sentry posts at the Palace of Whitehall until 1698, when the court and the sentry posts were relocated to St James's Palace. Following Queen Victoria's move to Buckingham Palace in 1837, sentry posts of the Queen's Guard were established there. The King's Guard has continued to maintain sentry posts at St James's Palace alongside those at Buckingham Palace.

== Operating area ==
The King's Guard and King's Life Guard are sentry postings that come under the operating area of the British Army's London District, which is responsible for the administration of the Household Division.

The Household Division typically has one infantry battalion posted for public duties; rotating between the first battalion of all five Foot Guards Regiments except the Scots Guards. In addition, there are five incremental companies based at Victoria Barracks, Windsor and Wellington Barracks - one each of the Grenadier, Coldstream and Scots Guards plus two from whichever Guards battalion is posted to 11 Brigade. All of these units come under the administrative authority of the London District – as public duties units, they not only take part in ceremonial but are also committed to providing military aid to the civilian authorities.

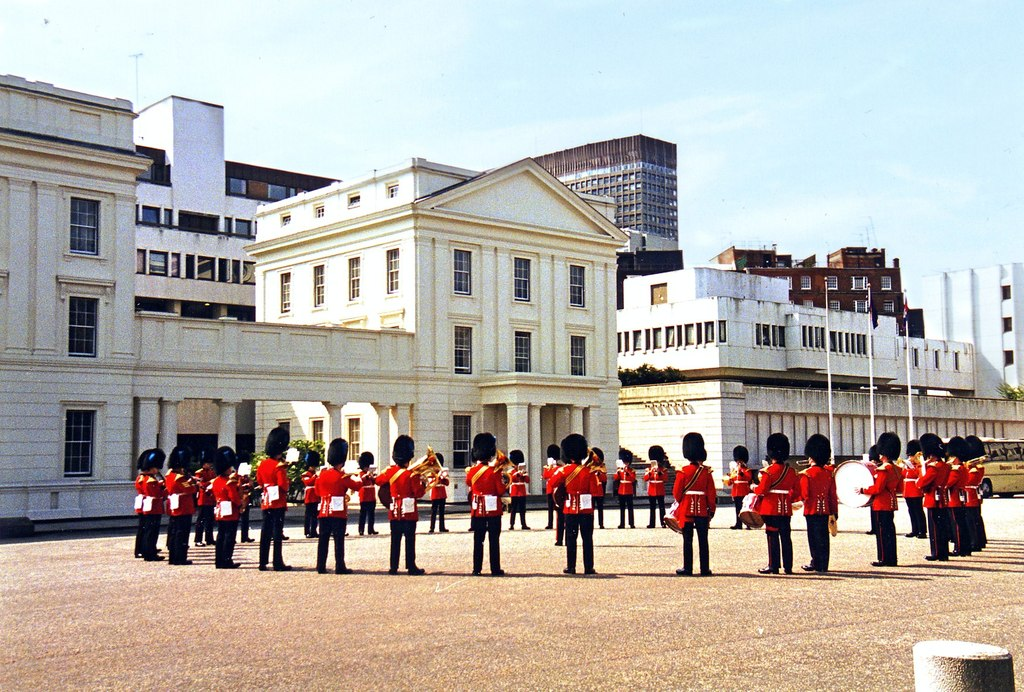
The band of the Irish Guards at Wellington Barracks, 2002. The barracks is used by foot guard battalions on public duties in London.

=== Buckingham Palace and St James's Palace ===
The King's Guard is the name given to the contingent of infantry responsible for guarding Buckingham Palace and St James's Palace (including Clarence House) in London. The guard is made up of a company of soldiers from a single regiment, which is split in two, providing a detachment for Buckingham Palace and a detachment for St James's Palace. Because the Sovereign's official residence is still St James's, the guard commander (called the captain of the guard) is based there, as are the regiment's colours. When the Sovereign is in residence, the King's Guard numbers three officers and forty other ranks, with four sentries each posted at Buckingham Palace (on the forecourt) and St James's Palace (two in Friary Court, two at the entrance to Clarence House). This reduces to three officers and 31 ORs, with two sentries each, when the Sovereign is not in residence. The King's Guard is not purely ceremonial. They provide sentries during the day and night, and during the later hours, they patrol the grounds of the Palace. Until 1959, the sentries at Buckingham Palace were stationed outside the fence. This stopped following an incident involving a female tourist and a Coldstream Guardsman – due to the continued pestering by tourists and sightseers, the guardsman kicked the tourist on the ankle as he marched. The tourist made a complaint to the police and the sentry was confined to barracks for ten days. Not long after, the sentries were moved inside the fence.

==== Detachments ====
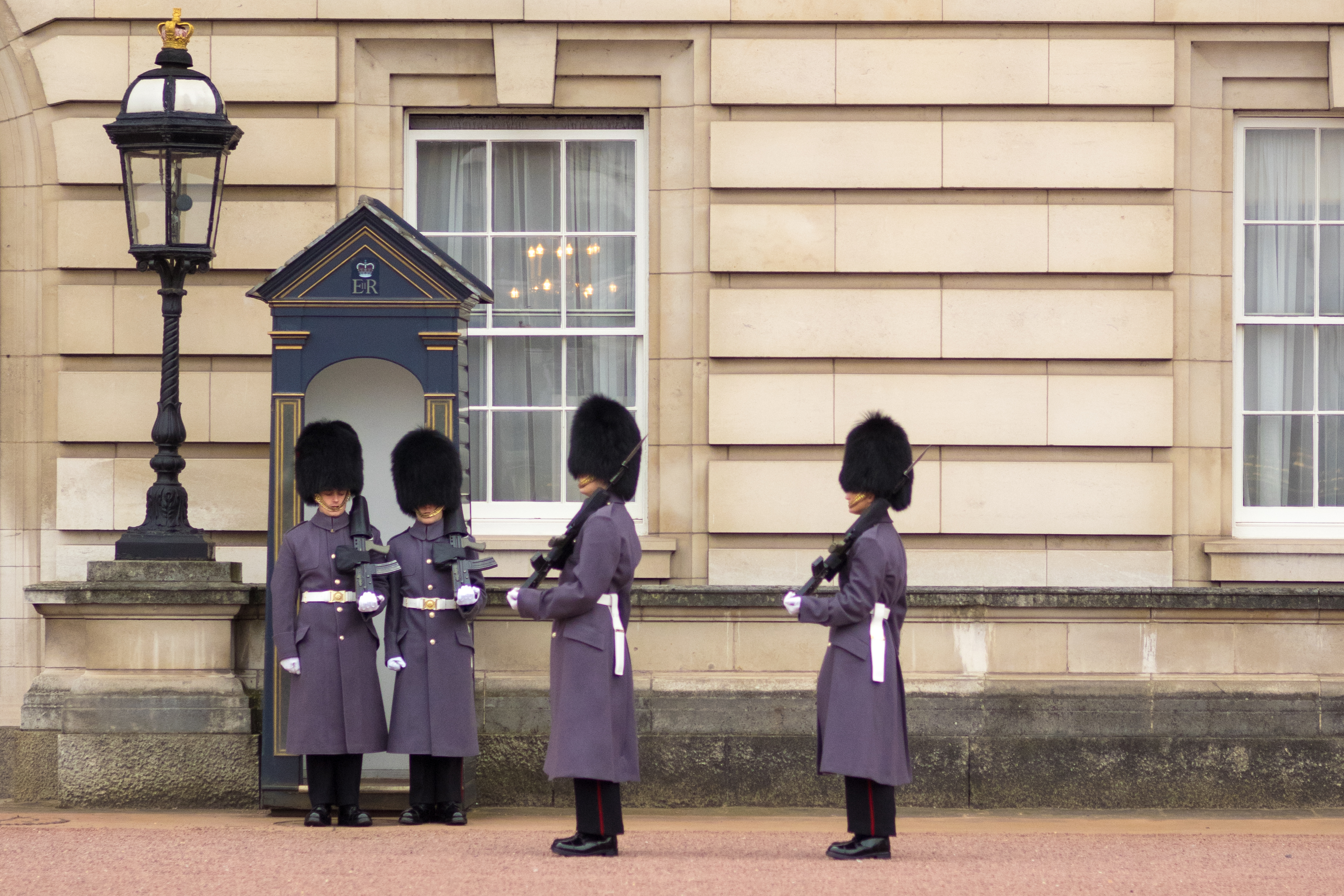
A sentry at Buckingham Palace being relieved during the changing of the guard.

The King's Guard in London changes in the forecourt of Buckingham Palace at 11:00 am every day in early summer and four times per week otherwise.

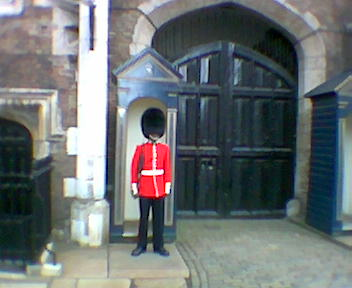
A sentry of the Grenadier Guards at St James Palace, 2007

The St James's Palace detachment of the King's Guard, led usually by the corps of drums, and bearing the colour (if the King is in residence, then this will be the King's colour; if he is not, then it is the regimental colour), marches along the Mall to Buckingham Palace, where the Buckingham Palace detachment has formed up to await their arrival. These two detachments are the old guard. Meanwhile, the new guard is forming and is awaiting inspection by the adjutant on the parade square at Wellington Barracks. The band, having been inspected by the adjutant, forms a circle to play music whilst the new guard is inspected. The guard provides a full military band consisting of no fewer than 35 musicians (usually from one of the Guard regiments) led by their director of music. When the new guard is formed up and led by the band, it marches across into the forecourt of Buckingham Palace. Once there, the new Guard advances toward the old guard in slow time and halts. The old guard presents arms, followed by the new guard presenting arms. The captains of the guards march towards each other for the handing over of the palace keys. The new reliefs are marched to the guardrooms of Buckingham Palace and St James's Palace where new sentries are posted.

During this time the band has taken its place by the centre gate, formed up in a half-circle, where it plays music to entertain the new and old guard as well as the watching crowds. During this period, the two regimental colours are paraded up and down by the ensigns (usually junior officers of second lieutenant rank or equivalent). With the old and new guards formed once again, the old guard and the band march out through the centre gates in slow time to their regimental slow march played by the band. At the end of the slow march, the captain of the old guard gives the word of command to 'break into quick time' and with a brisk five-pace roll from the drums, the band leads the way back to Wellington Barracks.

=== Horse Guards ===
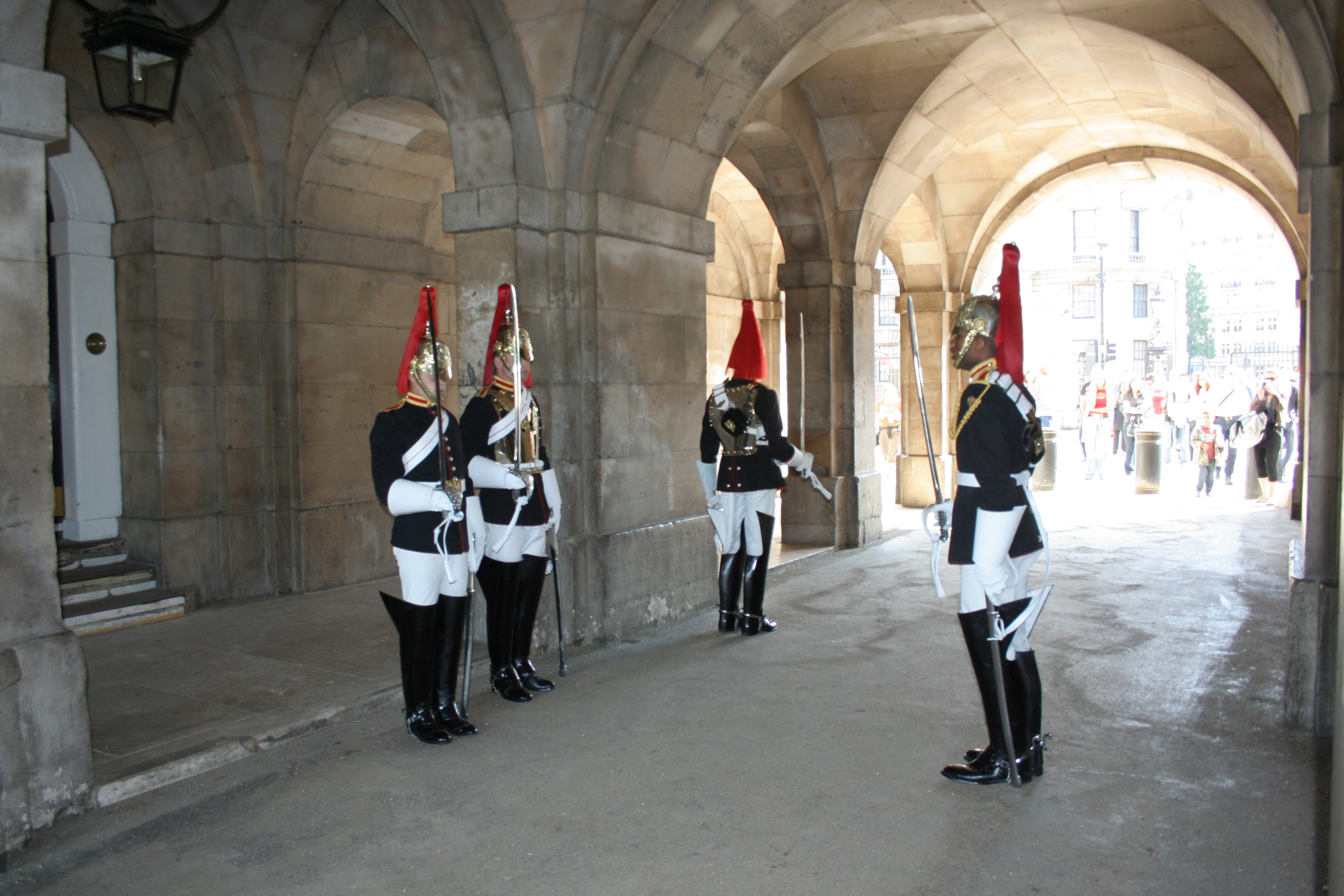
Dismounted troopers during the changing the King's Life Guard

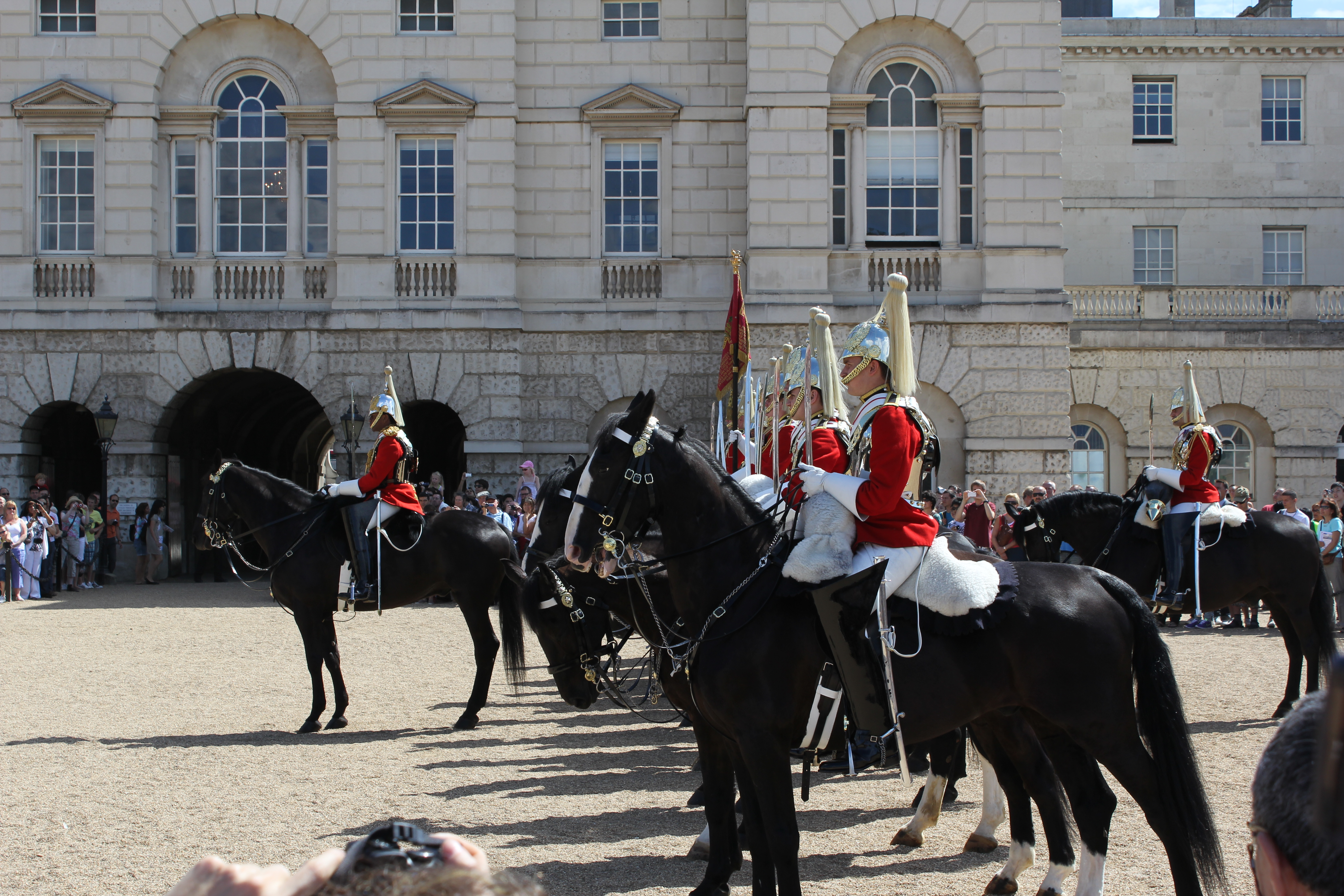
Mounted troopers during the changing of the King's Life Guard.

The King's Life Guard is the mounted guard at the entrance to Horse Guards. Horse Guards is the official main entrance to both St James's Palace and Buckingham Palace (a tradition that stems from the time when the Mall was closed at both ends); however, sentries have been posted there since the Stuart Restoration, when the Palace of Whitehall was the main royal residence.

The guard is on horseback from 10 am until 4 pm, with the two sentries changing every hour. From 4 pm until 8 pm a pair of dismounted sentries remain. At 8 pm, the gates of Horse Guards are locked, and a single sentry remains until 7 am. When the King is in London, the Guard consists of one officer, one corporal major (who carries the standard), two non-commissioned officers, one trumpeter and eleven troopers. This is known as a "long guard". When the King is not resident in London, the Guard is reduced to two non-commissioned officers and ten troopers. This is known as a "short guard".

At the time of guard changing, the old guard forms up on the north side of the enclosure on Horse Guards Parade and the new guard on the south side. As the new guard arrives, each guard carries the standard and the trumpeters of both old and new guards sound the royal salute on the arrival of the new guard and the departure of the old guard. When both guards have formed up in the enclosure, the corporal major, senior NCO and sentries of the first relief of the new guard leave for the guard room, which is then handed over. The sentries of the old guard, after being relieved, rejoin the remainder of the old guard on the north side of the enclosure. The standard and trumpeters are only on parade with a long guard.

== Procedure while at post ==
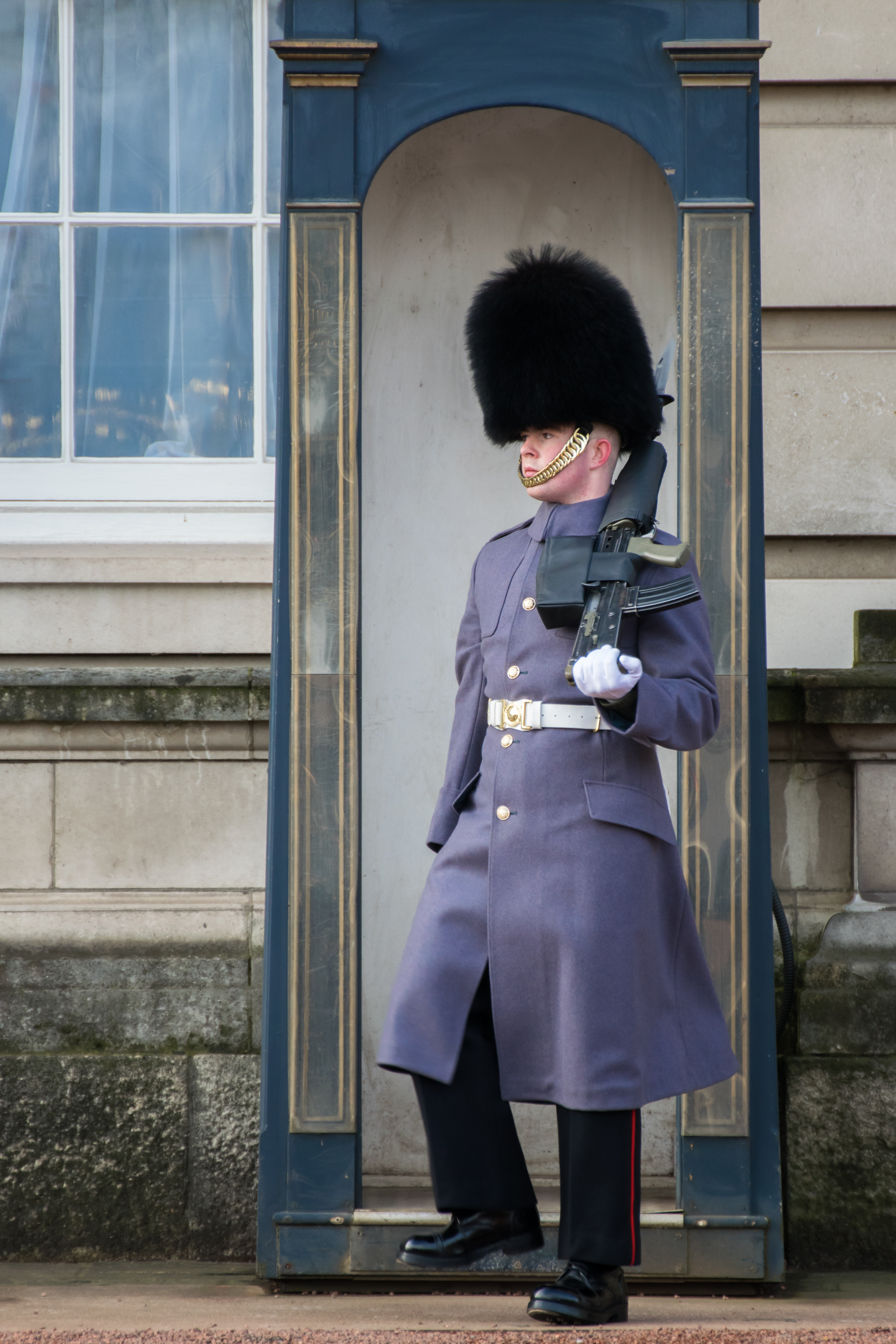
A sentry does a march across the area of the post at Buckingham Palace

A sentry will be on duty "at their post" for two hours. Every 10 minutes, he comes to attention, slopes arms and does a march of 15 paces across the area of the post. Each sentry does this four to five times before halting. He then shoulders arms and stands at ease. "Standing easy" is not permitted whilst a sentry is at their post. Orders for sentry duty read out before each two-hour "tour of duty", make it clear that sentries "may not eat, sleep, smoke, stand easy, sit or lie down during [their] tour of duty".

Sentries receive instruction on how to eliminate nuisance or any suggestion of threat from members of the public. There is a protocol they follow which begins with "stamping" (coming to attention sharply). He will also shout: "Stand back from the King's Guard" or similar. If this does not eliminate the nuisance or threat he will repeat the stamp and shout again. If the nuisance or threat still does not cease the sentry will assume the position of "port arms" whereby he points his rifle at the source of the interference. If these warnings are not heeded the sentry then has the choice of detaining the person(s) himself or pressing the button in his sentry box to summon assistance.

If a person steps in front of a sentry while he/she is marching, the latter will shout: "Make way for the King's Guard!".

=== Arms plot ===
Battalions on public duties were part of the regular arms plot, a system where infantry battalions were periodically rotated to various locations and different roles. Following the restructuring of the army announced in 2006, the arms plot system ceased – infantry battalions have now been given fixed roles and locations. In theory, this includes public duties in London, which will retain its two guards and one line infantry battalions. However, for some postings, including public duties, light role infantry battalions will continue to rotate. In the case of public duties in London, the four Guards battalions will rotate every two years, with two being posted as part of the Field Army in 4th Light Brigade Combat Team, one with 11 Brigade, and one Light Role public duties battalion. The shift from two to one public duties battalion has been offset by the addition of two more incremental companies, and the addition of four Guards reserve companies - who take supporting roles such as street lining in important occasions as well as on combat operations.

== Personnel ==
=== King's Guards ===
Postings for the King's Guard are usually formed from one of the five regiments of foot guards:

- Grenadier Guards
- Coldstream Guards
- Scots Guards
- Irish Guards
- Welsh Guards

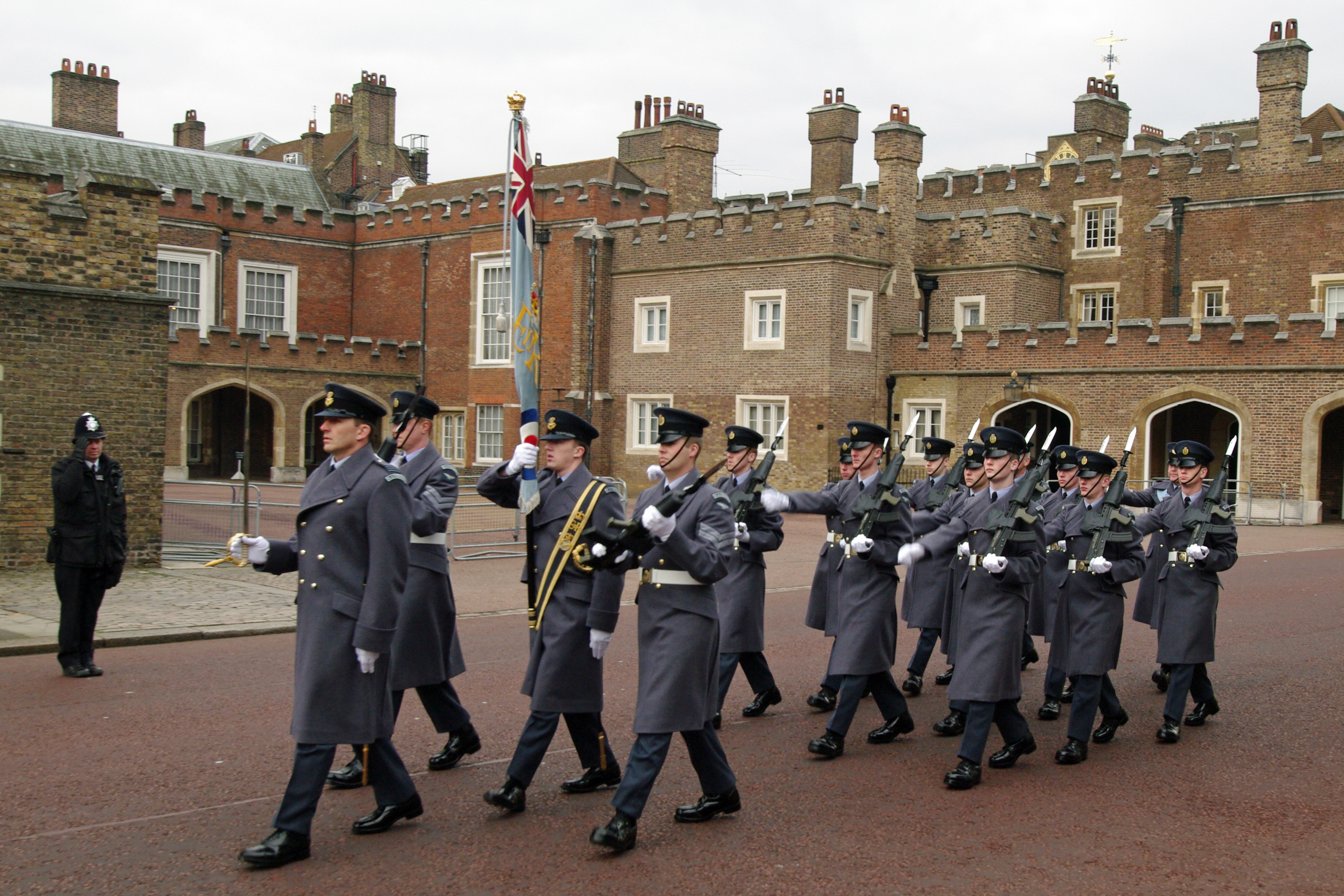
Members of the King's Colour Squadron at St James Palace. The ceremonial unit mounts the King's Guard for several weeks each year.

In addition, the RAF Regiment takes over the guard for around three weeks per year. The King's Colour Squadron is the RAF Regiment's dedicated ceremonial unit for this task. The King's Colour Squadron represents the whole Royal Air Force as the units mounting the guard need to be infantry trained.

On occasion, other units from the British Army and Royal Navy have provided the guard. Additionally, other units from the armed forces of several Commonwealth countries have formed the guard.

==== Other British Army units ====
Several other British Army units have also formed the guard. Prior to Options for Change, because there were a total of eight guards battalions, it was rare for battalions of line infantry to mount the King's Guard and, as such, was a significant honour. Before 1996, only two battalions had served on public duties as part of an operational tour in London District. However, when the 2nd Battalions of the Grenadier Guards, Coldstream Guards and Scots Guards were put in suspended animation, a decision to replace one of the three Foot Guard battalions then engaged on public duties by a line infantry battalion was taken, so as to enable the Foot Guards battalion to increase the proportion of its effort employed on training for operational roles. From 1996 to 2013, a line infantry battalion was stationed in London (first at Hounslow, then Woolwich) under the command of London District:

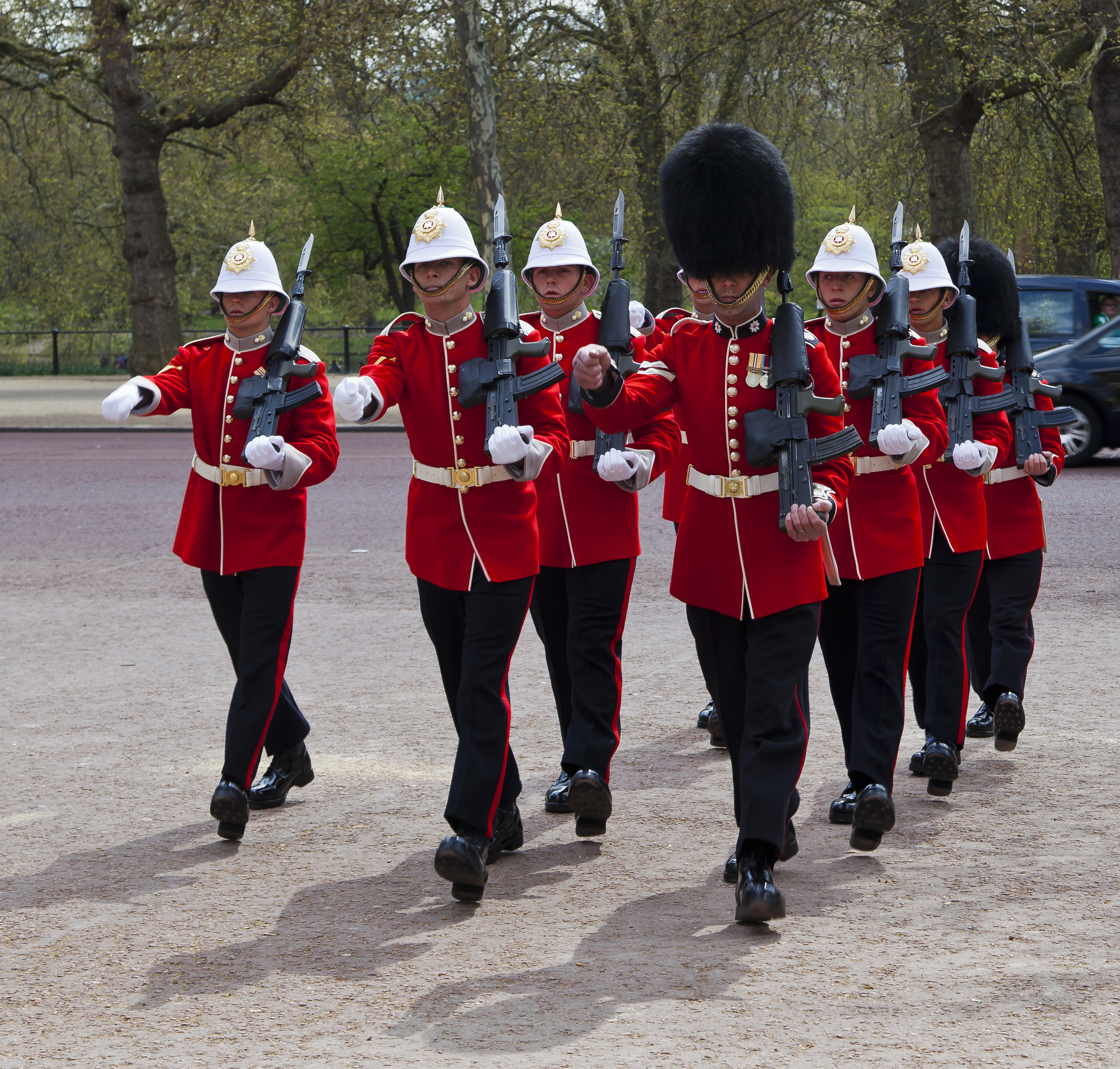
Members of the Royal Gibraltar Regiment taking up guard duties, as a member of the Coldstream Guards (right foreground) escorts them

Since 2013, regular public duties responsibility has reverted to the Household Division. However, line infantry units occasionally provide the Guard for short periods of time. The Royal Gibraltar Regiment is a line infantry regiment and home defence unit of British Forces Gibraltar, that formed the Queen's Guard in March 2001, April 2012 and March 2022. In 2012, the Royal Gibraltar Regiment became the first unit to provide both the Queen's Guard and the Saluting Battery simultaneously. In the summer of 2018, Balaklava Company, the dedicated public duties unit of the Royal Regiment of Scotland, and 2nd Battalion, The Rifles, both provided the Guard at Buckingham Palace and Windsor Castle. Balaklava Company also mounted King's Guard in London in December 2025 and April 2026.

Units from the Army Reserve, and its predecessor, the Territorial Army, have also formed the guard. In 1938, the Honourable Artillery Company, a Territorial Army unit, provided the King's Guard. The same regiment subsequently provided the Queen's Guard in 1958. In June 2015, soldiers from the 3rd Battalion, Royal Welsh, provided the Tower of London detachment of the Queen's Guard.

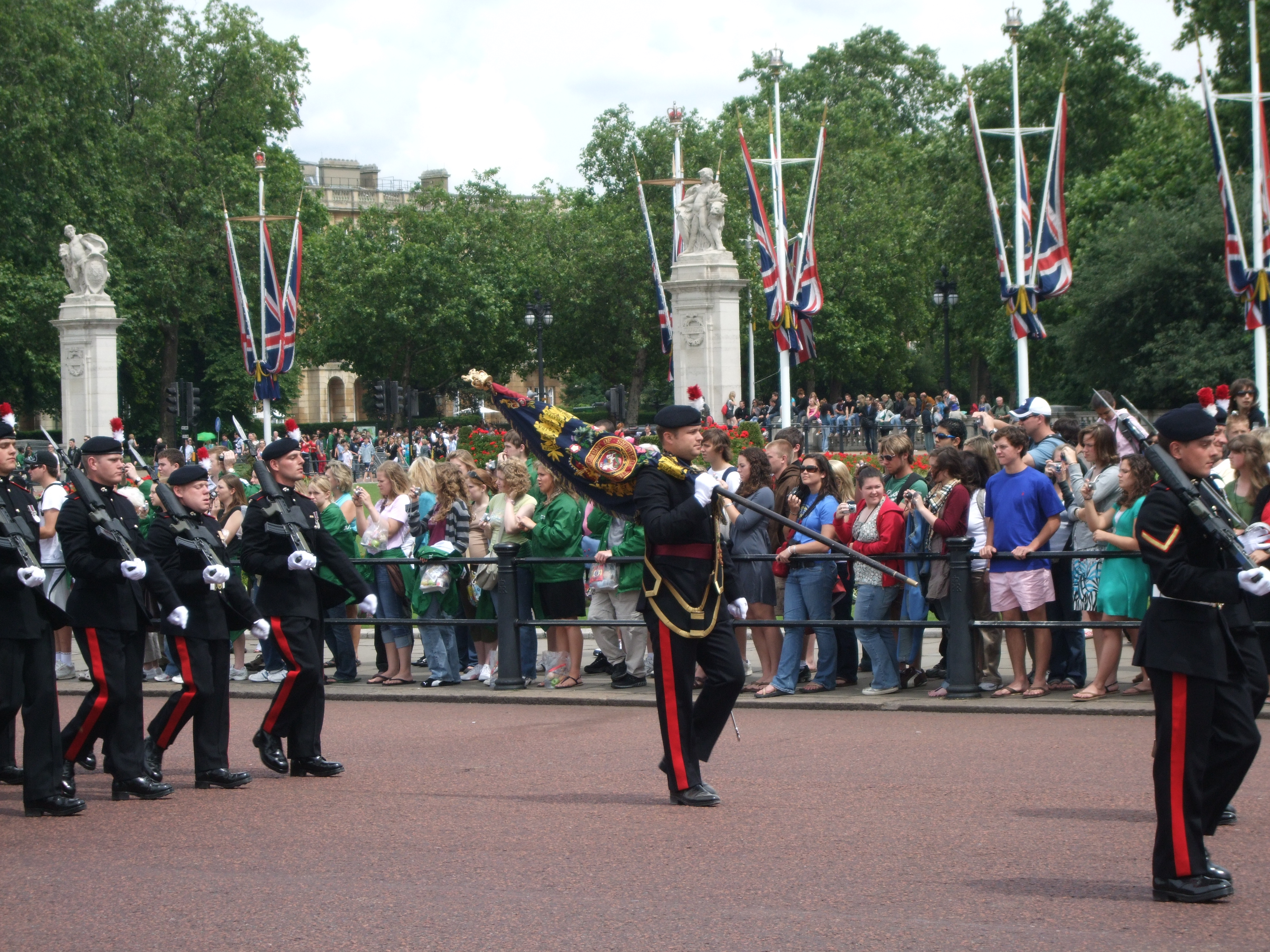
Members of The Royal Regiment of Fusiliers during a changing of the guard ceremony at Buckingham Palace, 2008

The following is a list of units of the line infantry regiments that have formed the King's Guard:

1st Battalion, The 22nd (Cheshire) Regiment	1986–1988
1st Battalion, The King's Regiment	1992–1996
1st Battalion, The Royal Regiment of Wales (24th/41st Foot)	1996–1997
1st Battalion, The Duke of Wellington's Regiment (West Riding)	1998–2000
1st Battalion, The Devonshire and Dorset Regiment	2000–2001
1st Battalion, The Royal Gloucestershire, Berkshire and Wiltshire Regiment	2002–2005
1st Battalion, The Worcestershire and Sherwood Foresters Regiment (29th/45th Foot)	2005–2007
2nd Battalion, The Mercian Regiment (Worcesters and Foresters)	2007–2008
2nd Battalion, The Royal Regiment of Fusiliers	2008–2010
2nd Battalion, The Princess of Wales's Royal Regiment (Queen's and Royal Hampshires)	2011–2013

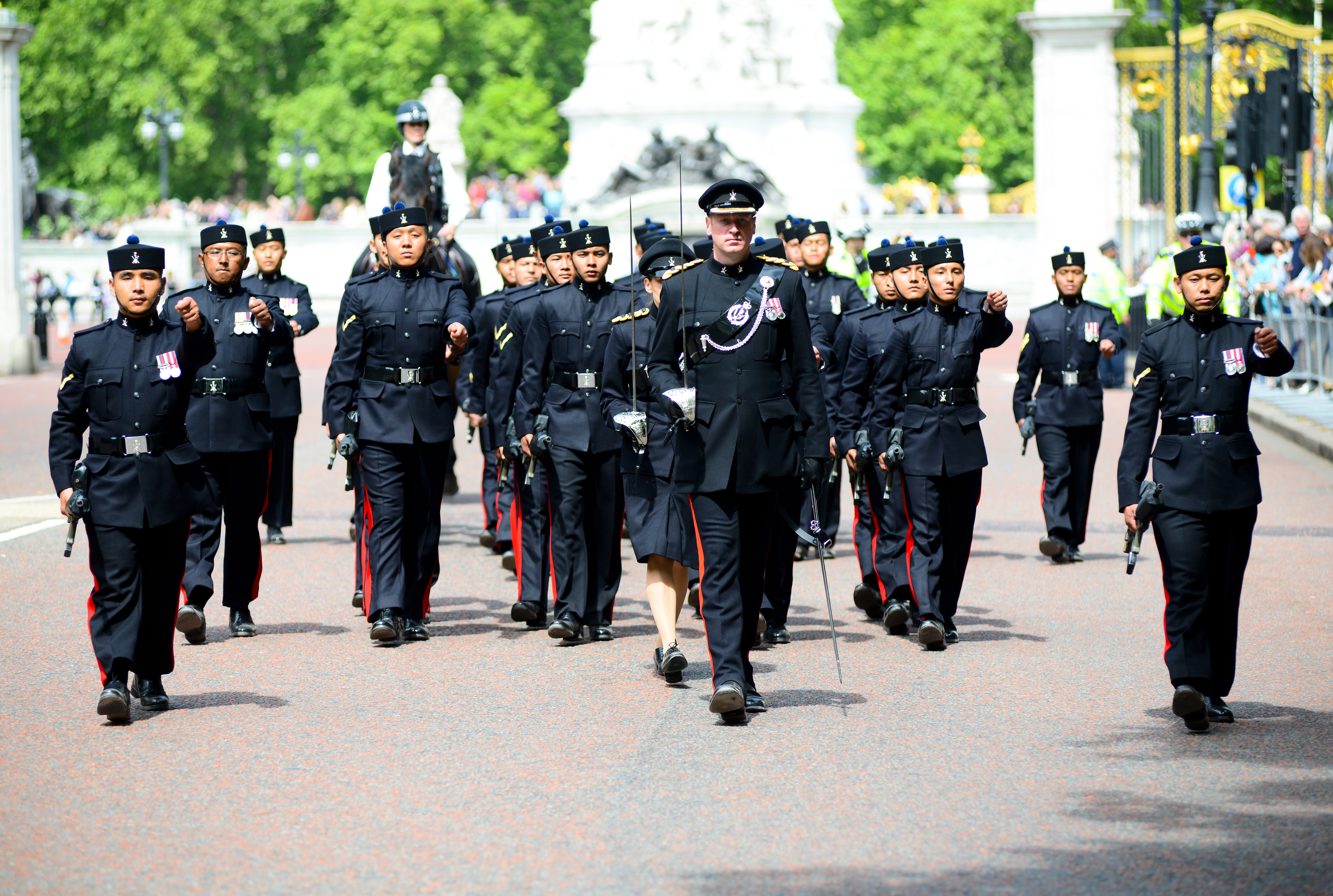
The Queen's Gurkha Signals during the changing of the guard ceremony for the King’s Guard at Buckingham Palace

The following is a list of Gurkha units that have formed the guard:

1st Battalion, 7th Duke of Edinburgh's Own Gurkha Rifles	December 1971
2nd Battalion, 2nd King Edward VII's Own Gurkha Rifles (The Sirmoor Rifles)	November 1975
1st Battalion, 6th Queen Elizabeth's Own Gurkha Rifles	August 1977
1st Battalion, Royal Gurkha Rifles	August 1996
Brigade of Gurkhas	May 2015
10 Queen's Own Gurkha Logistic Regiment	May–Jul 2019
10 Queen's Own Gurkha Logistic Regiment	May–Jun 2022
Queen's Gurkha Signals	Apr–May 2024

==== Other British armed units ====
On 14 May 1941, the Home Guard provided the King's Guard, in recognition of the first anniversary of its foundation. This was repeated in May 1943.

Royal Marines units have formed the guard on three occasions. 41 Commando formed the guard in November 1978, while 42 Commando formed the guard in July 1986 and June 2014.

In November 2017, the Royal Navy mounted the guard with a company-sized detachment formed of volunteers from 45 ships and shore establishments for two weeks. This was the first time that the Royal Navy had formed the Guard in its own right, rather than being represented by the Royal Marines.

Airborne sappers from 9 Parachute Squadron RE (now of 23 Parachute Engineer Regiment) conducted the guard in 1987, 2009 and 2023.

From January to February 2025, the King's Guard was mounted by the 222 Signal Squadron and attached personnel from 22 Signal Regiment.

26 Engineer Regiment formed the King's Guard during September to November 2026.

==== Commonwealth units ====
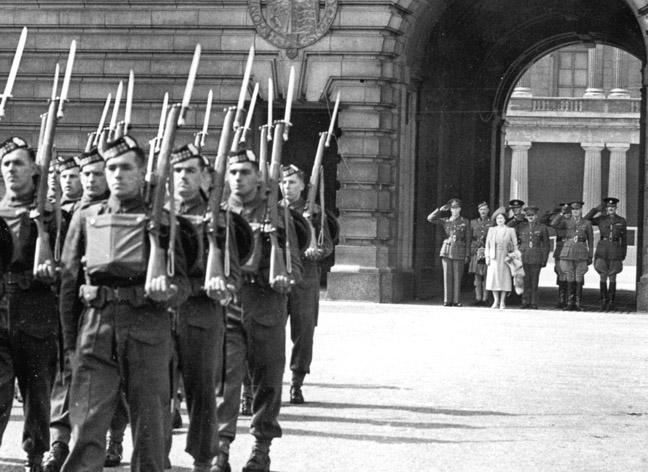
The Toronto Scottish Regiment mounting the King's Guard, 1940

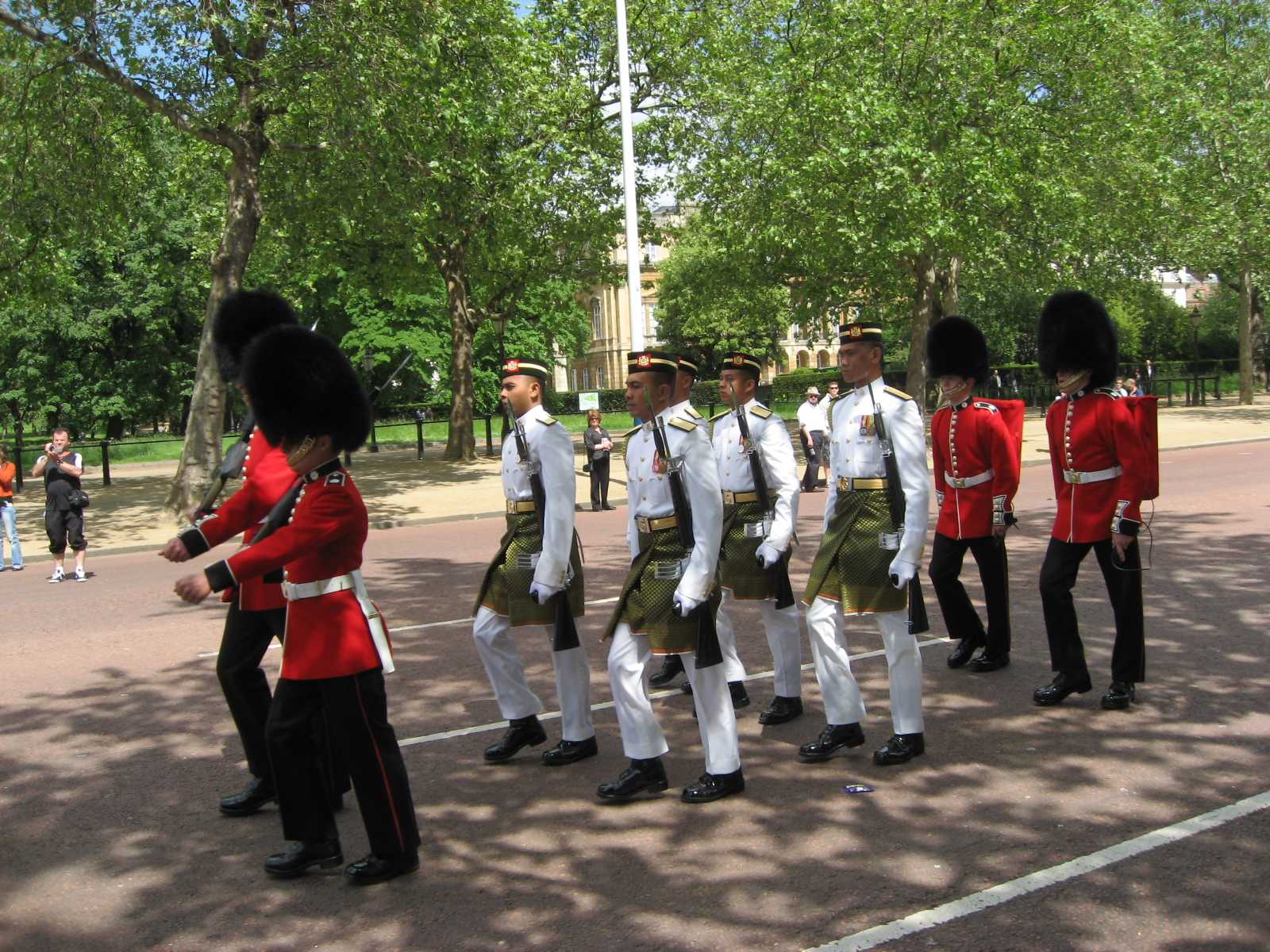
Soldiers from the Royal Malay Regiment in London, 2008

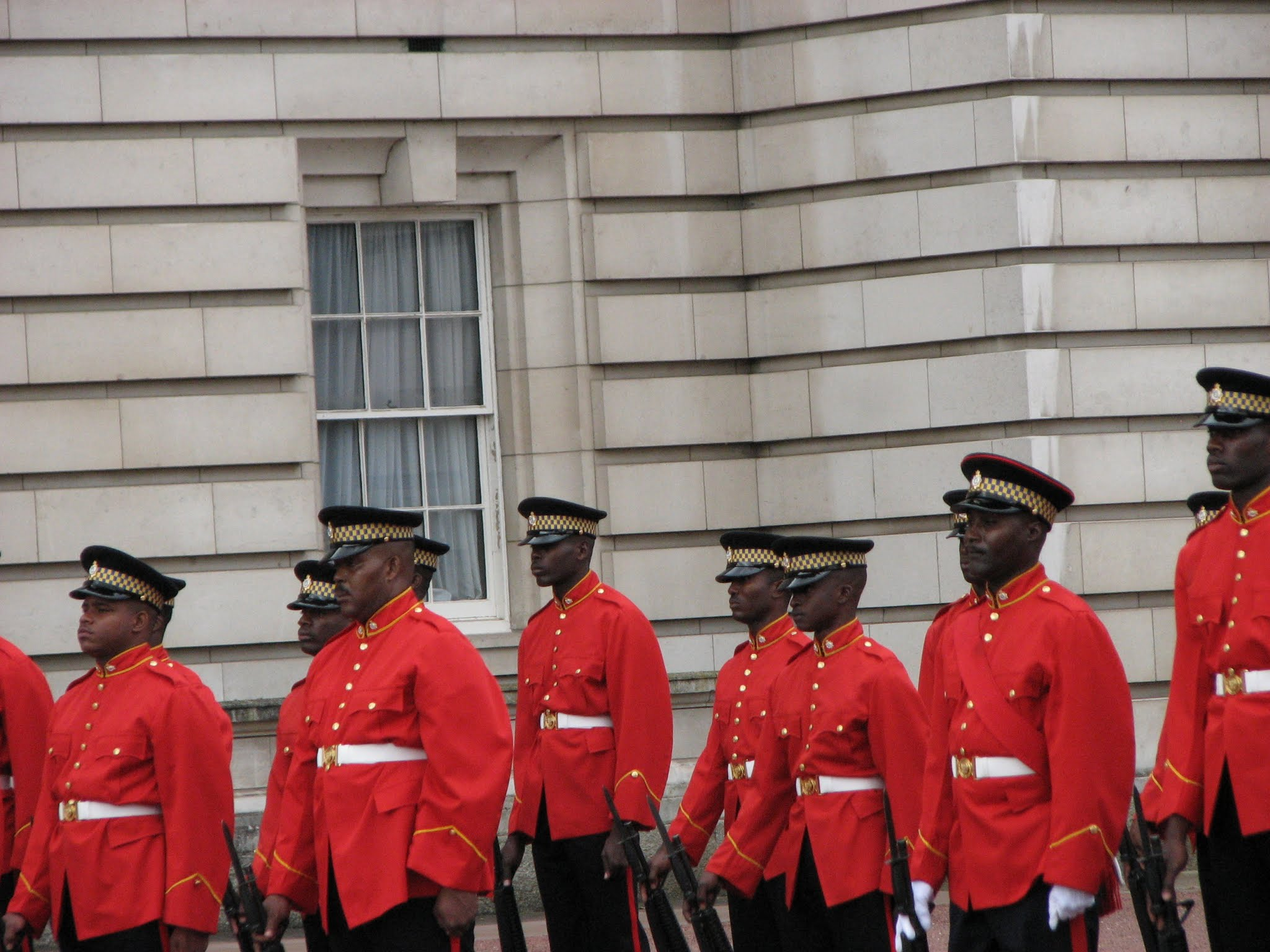
Sentries of the Jamaica Regiment outside Buckingham Palace, 2007

Units from the British Empire and Commonwealth of Nations have occasionally formed the King's Guard. The 117th (Eastern Townships) Battalion of the Canadian Expeditionary Force was the first non-British unit to form the guard in 1916. The first time commands were given in another language other than English occurred in 1940, when the French Canadian Royal 22^{e} Régiment formed the guard and issued their commands in French. Only one unit from a Commonwealth country where the sovereign was not head of state has formed the guard, the 1st Battalion, Royal Malay Regiment in 2008.

British Empire and Commonwealth units have formed the guard to mark a number of occasions, such as the coronations of George VI in 1937 and Elizabeth II in 1953. Commonwealth units have also formed the guard to mark anniversaries or to reinforce close ties with the United Kingdom. The Royal Canadian Air Force mounted the guard in 2018 to commemorate the Royal Air Force's 100th anniversary and the cooperative history between the two air forces.

Units that have formed the guard to commemorate national historic anniversaries include the 1st Battalion, Royal Australian Regiment, who formed the guard in 1988 to commemorate the 200th anniversary of the First Fleet's arrival to Australia, and the Federation Guard in 2000 to commemorate the centenary of the Federation of Australia. The Princess Patricia's Canadian Light Infantry also formed the guard in 2017 to commemorate the 150th anniversary of Canadian Confederation.

Units have also formed the guard to commemorate their own anniversaries, with the Royal 22^{e} Régiment forming the guard in 2014 to commemorate their 100th anniversary, and The Royal Regiment of Canadian Artillery forming the guard in 2021 to commemorate their 150th anniversary.

Some Commonwealth units will form the guard on days that are significant to their country, with the Jamaica Regiment having mounted the guard on Jamaican Emancipation Day and Independence Day, and the Royal Canadian Air Force having formed the guard on Canada Day.

The following is a list of units from the British Empire and Commonwealth to have mounted the King's Guard:

Unit	Country	Date
117th (Eastern Townships) Battalion, CEF	Canada	September 1916
Canadian Coronation Contingent	Canada	May 1937
Australian Coronation Contingent	Australia	May 1937
Royal 22^{e} Régiment	Canada	April 1940
Toronto Scottish Regiment	Canada	April 1940
The Royal Canadian Regiment	Canada	April 1940
Canadian Coronation Contingent	Canada	May 1953
Australian Coronation Contingent	Australia	May 1953
South African Coronation Contingent	South Africa	June 1953
New Zealand Coronation Contingent	New Zealand	June 1953
Ceylon Coronation Contingent	Ceylon	June 1953
Pakistan Coronation Contingent	Pakistan	June 1953
Royal New Zealand Artillery	New Zealand	November 1964
1st Battalion, Royal Australian Regiment	Australia	April 1988
3rd Battalion, Princess Patricia's Canadian; Light Infantry	Canada	April 1988–May 1988
2nd Battalion, Jamaica Regiment	Jamaica	April 1999
Australian Federation Guard plus the Band of the Royal Military College, Duntroon	Australia	July 2000
2nd Battalion, The Royal Canadian Regiment	Canada	September 2000
1st Battalion, Jamaica Regiment plus the Combined Band of the JDF	Jamaica	July 2007–August 2007
1st Battalion, Royal Malay Regiment plus the Band of the Royal Malay Regiment	Malaysia	April 2008
2nd Battalion, Royal 22^{e} Régiment	Canada	July 2014
2nd Battalion, Princess Patricia's Canadian; Light Infantry plus the Royal Canadian Artillery Band	Canada	June 2017–July 2017
Royal Canadian Air Force plus the Royal Canadian Air Force Band	Canada	June 2018–July 2018
3rd Battalion, The Royal Canadian Regiment plus the Royal Canadian Artillery Band	Canada	October 2018–November 2018
Royal Regiment of Canadian Artillery plus the Royal Canadian Artillery Band	Canada	October 2021

==== Non-Commonwealth units ====
On 8 April 2024, to commemorate the 120th anniversary of the Entente Cordiale, a detachment from the 2e Régiment d'Infanterie of the French Garde Republicaine became the first unit from a non-Commonwealth country to participate in the ceremony - the detachment were marched onto the forecourt of Buckingham Palace in place of that day's New Guard, and were inspected by the Duke and Duchess of Edinburgh alongside Hélène Tréheux-Duchêne, the French Ambassador to the United Kingdom, before then being marched off. In a reciprocal arrangement, soldiers of No. 7 Company, Coldstream Guards took part in the guard mounting ceremony at the Élysée Palace, official residence of the French President, in Paris.

=== King's Life Guard ===
The guard is usually provided by the Household Cavalry Mounted Regiment (HCMR), with the Life Guards and the Blues and Royals alternating. When the HCMR leaves London for a month of summer training (and rest for the horses), the guard is provided by the King's Troop, Royal Horse Artillery.

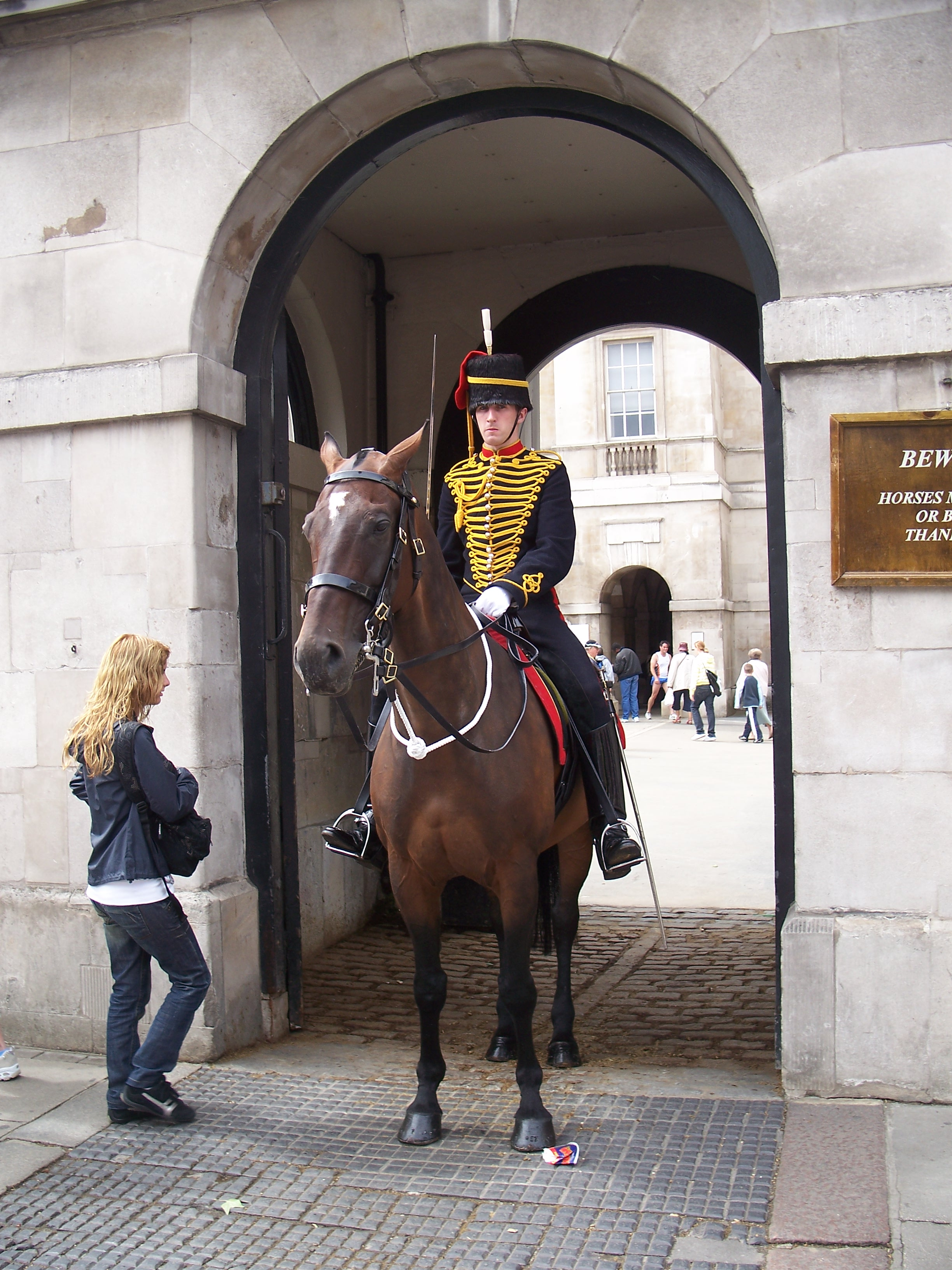
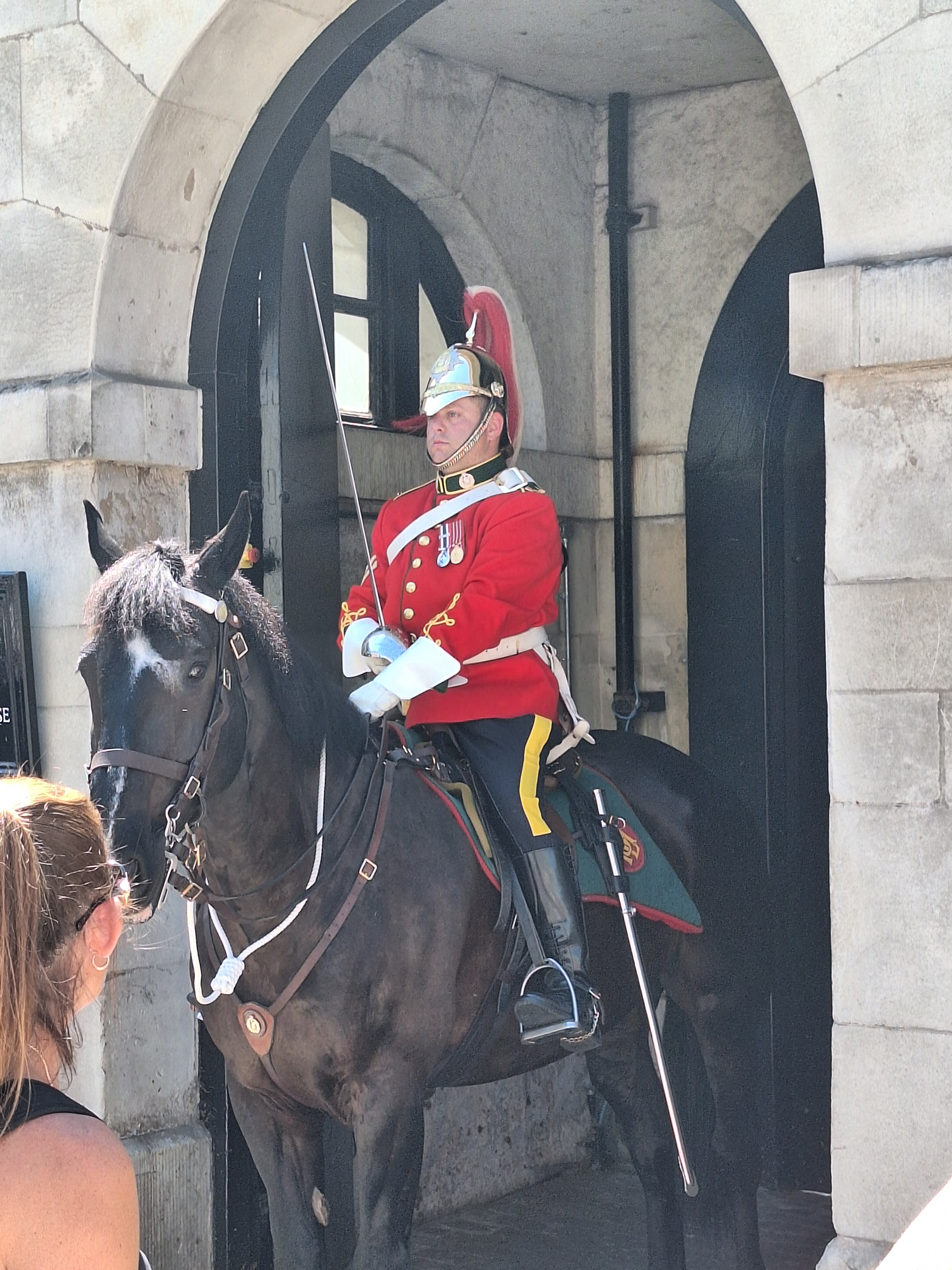
Sentries of the King's Troop, Royal Horse Artillery (left) and Lord Strathcona's Horse (right) posted outside Horse Guards.

Only two other units have mounted the Life Guard, the Mounted Troop of Lord Strathcona's Horse (Royal Canadians), a regiment of the Royal Canadian Armoured Corps, and the Royal Canadian Mounted Police (RCMP). The Lord Strathcona's mounted the Life Guard twice, in 2000 and July 2025, to mark its 100th and 125th anniversaries respectively. The RCMP mounted the Life Guard in May 2012 to commemorate Elizabeth II's Diamond Jubilee, becoming the only non-military unit to take up the posting.

=== Musical accompaniments ===
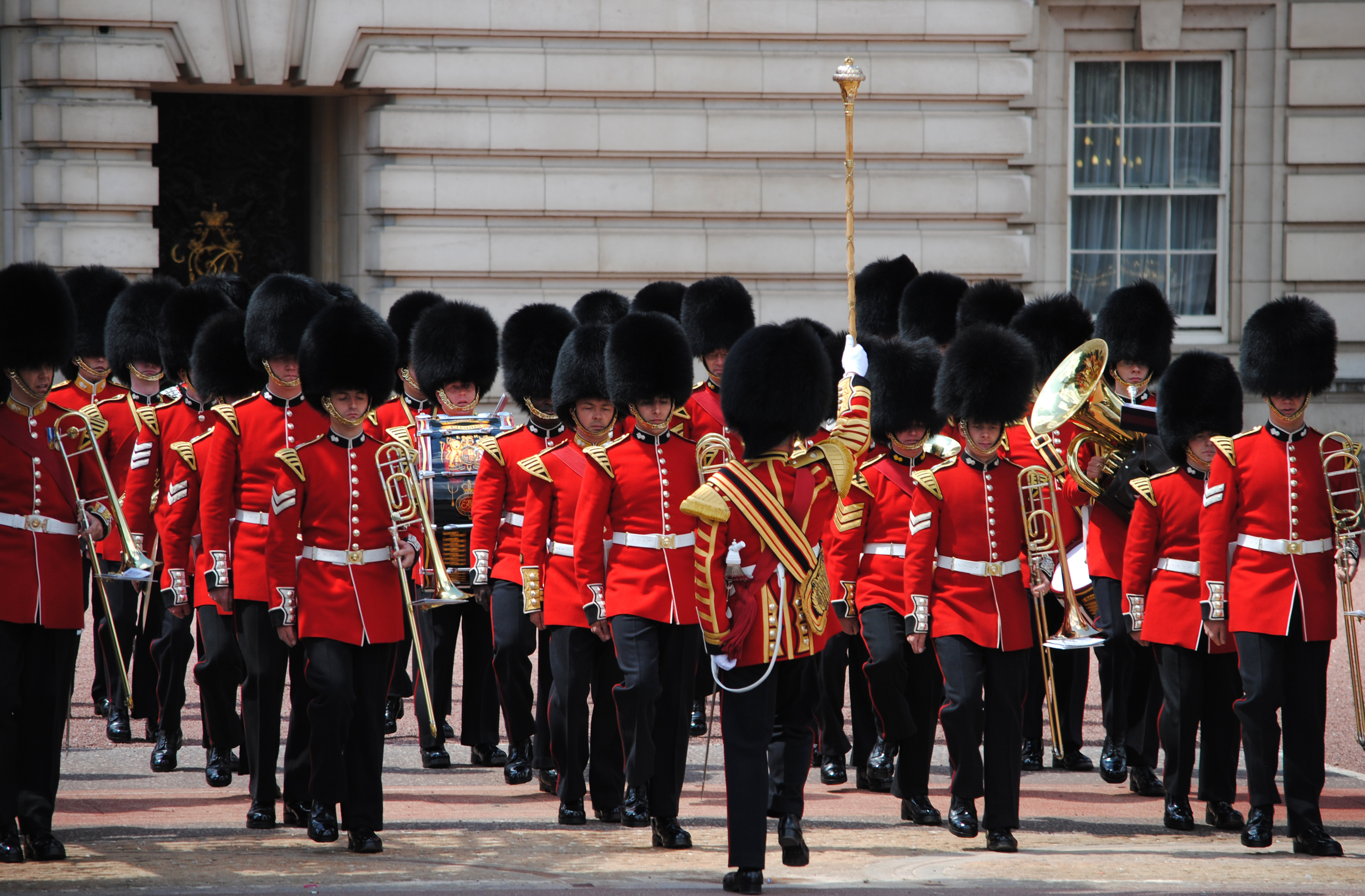
The band of the Grenadier Guards provides musical accompaniment for the changing of the guard ceremony at Buckingham Palace

Musical accompaniments for the King's Guard are typically provided by one of the seven military bands of the Household Division. This includes the Mounted Band of the Household Cavalry, the Countess of Wessex's String Orchestra and the five bands for the foot guards. The Foot Guards bands are:

- Band of the Grenadier Guards
- Band of the Coldstream Guards
- Band of the Scots Guards
- Band of the Irish Guards
- Band of the Welsh Guards

In addition to the bands of the Household Division, several other bands have been invited to provide musical support for the Queen's Guards. The band of the Honourable Artillery Company has occasionally been invited to provide musical support since the 1990s and continues to do so in the 21st century.

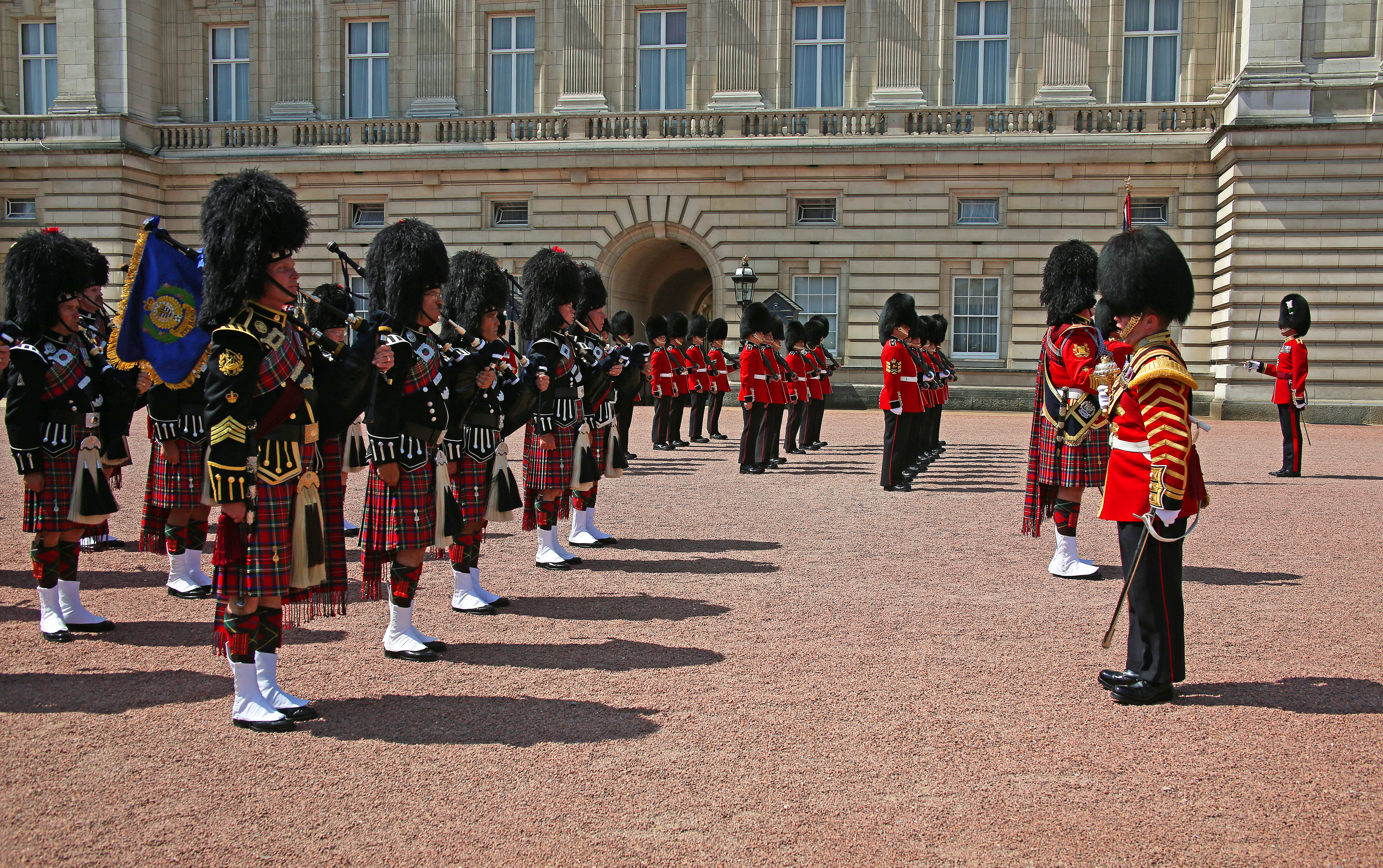
The Vancouver Police Pipe Band provided musical support during a guard mounting ceremony for the Queen's Guard

Several military bands from the Commonwealth have also provided musical support during guard mounting ceremonies, typically when their respective national military units are mounting the guard. In May and June 2014, the Vancouver Police Pipe Band was invited to provide musical support during the mounting of the Queen's Guard, to commemorate its 100th anniversary. The pipe band was the first non-military pipe band to perform during a guard mounting ceremony.

In 2025, several non-Commonwealth military bands were invited to perform during the changing of the guard ceremony at Buckingham Palace. These included the Ukrainian Navy Band, which participated in August to mark the Independence Day of Ukraine, and the United States Army's Old Guard Fife and Drum Corps, which performed in September.

=== Women and the guard ===
The first woman to mount the King's Guard was Captain Cynthia Anderson of Australia's Federation Guard in 2000. She was also the first female to command a Queen's Guard detachment, having led an Australian Federation Guard unit during morning parade. The first female infantry officer to command the Queen's Guard through the changing of the guard was Captain Megan Couto of the Canadian Army's 2nd Battalion, Princess Patricia's Canadian Light Infantry in June 2017.

In April 2007, the first women from a British Army unit served on detachments of the Queen's Guard, when the King's Troop, Royal Horse Artillery took over the guard at Windsor Castle, and the Army Air Corps took on public duties in London. Female officers were also among the contingent of Royal Canadian Mounted Police members who formed the Queen's Life Guard in May 2012.

== Incidents ==
=== Breaches in security ===
The King's Guard is an operational posting, with the primary purpose of protecting the Sovereign. There have been a handful of incidents when this protection has been tested. In 1982, a man named Michael Fagan was able to evade the sentries before he was captured by police. In this instance, security of the Queen's room was the task of the Metropolitan Police.

In 2004, a member of the pressure group Fathers4Justice spent five and a half hours standing on the parapet by the balcony at the front of Buckingham Palace. Again, the security was the primary responsibility of the Metropolitan Police. Although the Queen was not present at the time, it raised fears of the possibility of a terrorist attack on the palace.

=== Tourist interference ===
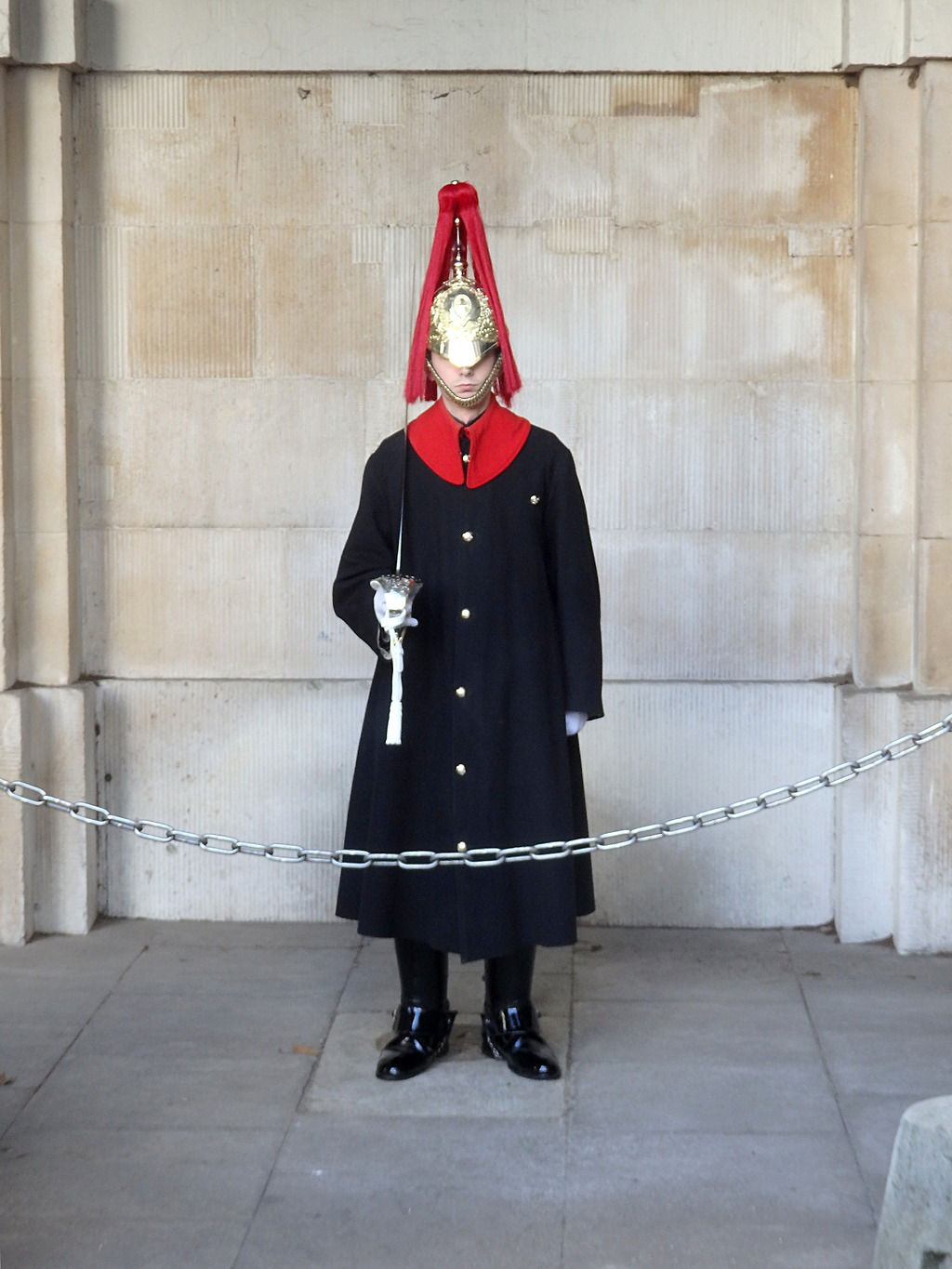
A King’s Life Guard sentry stands behind a chain-link barrier, separating him from the public

Although the guards were previously positioned among the public, in recent times, more and more of the sentry posts have been moved away from the public because of incidents involving tourists interfering with the guards' job, as well as incidents where the guards have had to discipline tourists for disrespectful or dangerous behaviour. In 2012, footage of a tourist disrespecting the guards went viral, in which a Russian tourist refused to stop their attempt at climbing the Buckingham Palace fence despite the guard aiming his SA80 rifle at the would-be intruder. Similar arrangements also had to be made at other postings, with ropes installed between the sentry posts at Windsor Castle and the public after an incident occurred between a sentry and a tourist who was mocking him, pretending to march alongside him and eventually grabbing the shoulder on which his rifle was resting.

In London, the sentry posts most recently remaining not behind any sort of fence were those at the Pall Mall entrance to St James's Palace. In December 2014, the Pall Mall sentries were moved to Friary Court inside the walls of the palace, while the Clarence House sentries repositioned inside the fence and at the entrance to the gardens. This was a result of the increased threat of lone wolf terrorist attacks, particularly following the murder of a British soldier in Woolwich, and the terrorist attack on the Canadian Parliament.

== Related sentry postings ==
In addition to the King's Guard, the Household Division is also responsible for mounting the Tower of London Guard and the Windsor Castle Guard. The Household Division considers these other sentry posts as distinct postings from the King's Guard, although colloquially, these other postings have also been called the "King's Guard".

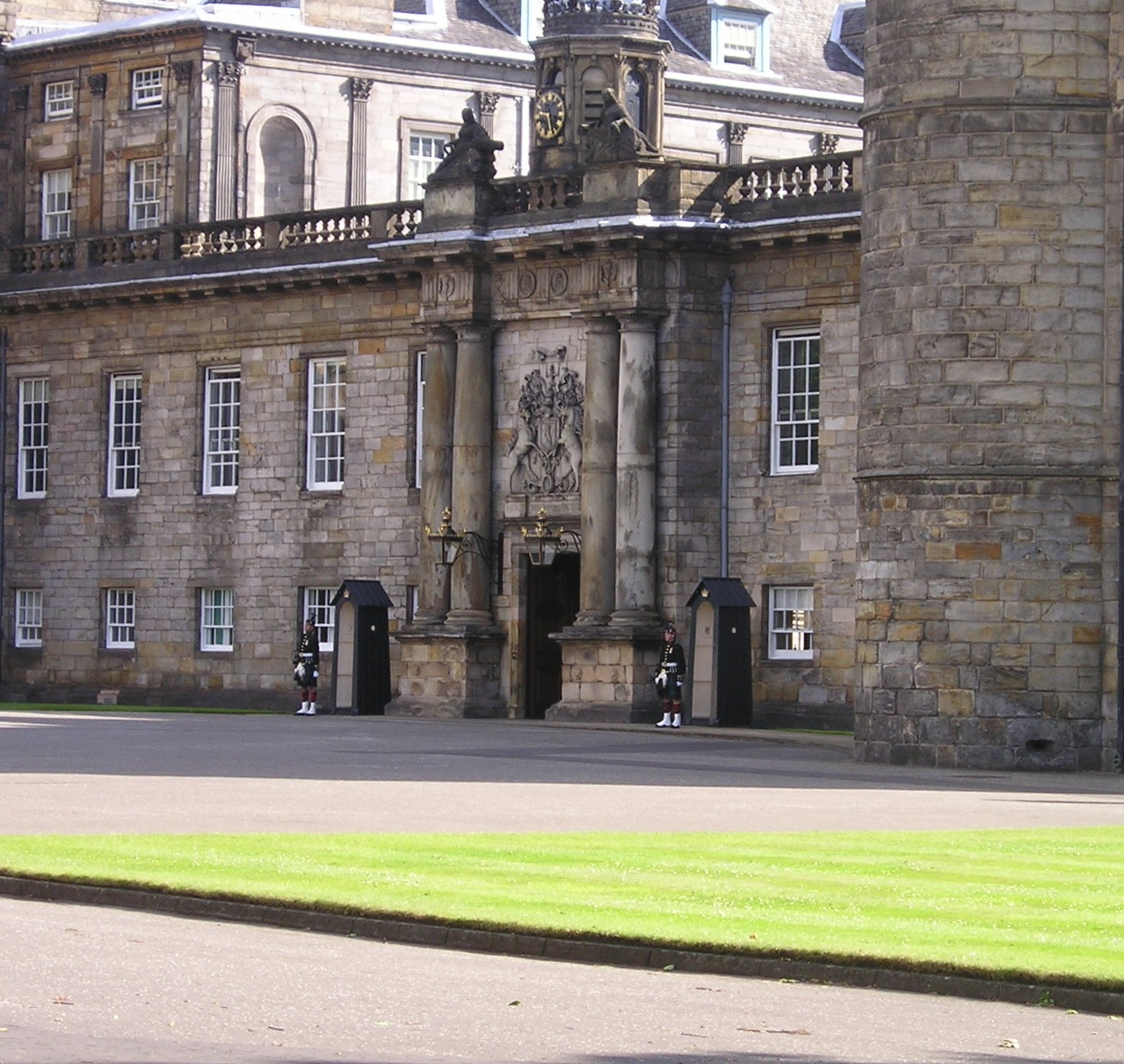
Guards posted outside the Palace of Holyrood

Scottish regiments posted at Redford Barracks may also post sentries at Edinburgh Castle and the Palace of Holyrood, the sovereign's residence in Edinburgh.

The procedures for these postings are similar to those of the King's Guard but are tailored to each specific location. This includes distinct declarations such as "Make way for the [name of posting]!"

=== London ===
In addition to the King's Guard, the Household Division also manned several other guard positions in London. In 1819, the Household Division maintained ten separate guard mountings for 89 sentry posts. This included the Armoury Guard, the British Museum Guard, the Kensington Palace Guard, the Magazine Guard, the Military Asylum Guard, the Savoy Prison Guard, the Tylt Guards at the south of Horse Guards, and the York Hospital Guard. The Household Division had also provided night guards for the Bank of England, Covent Garden Opera House, and Drury Lane. However, the Household Division's commitment to most of these postings, except for the King's Guard, ceased by the end of the 19th century. Some postings were abandoned due to a building's demolition. Responsibility for the British Museum Guard was transferred to the Metropolitan Police in 1866.

==== Tower of London Guard ====
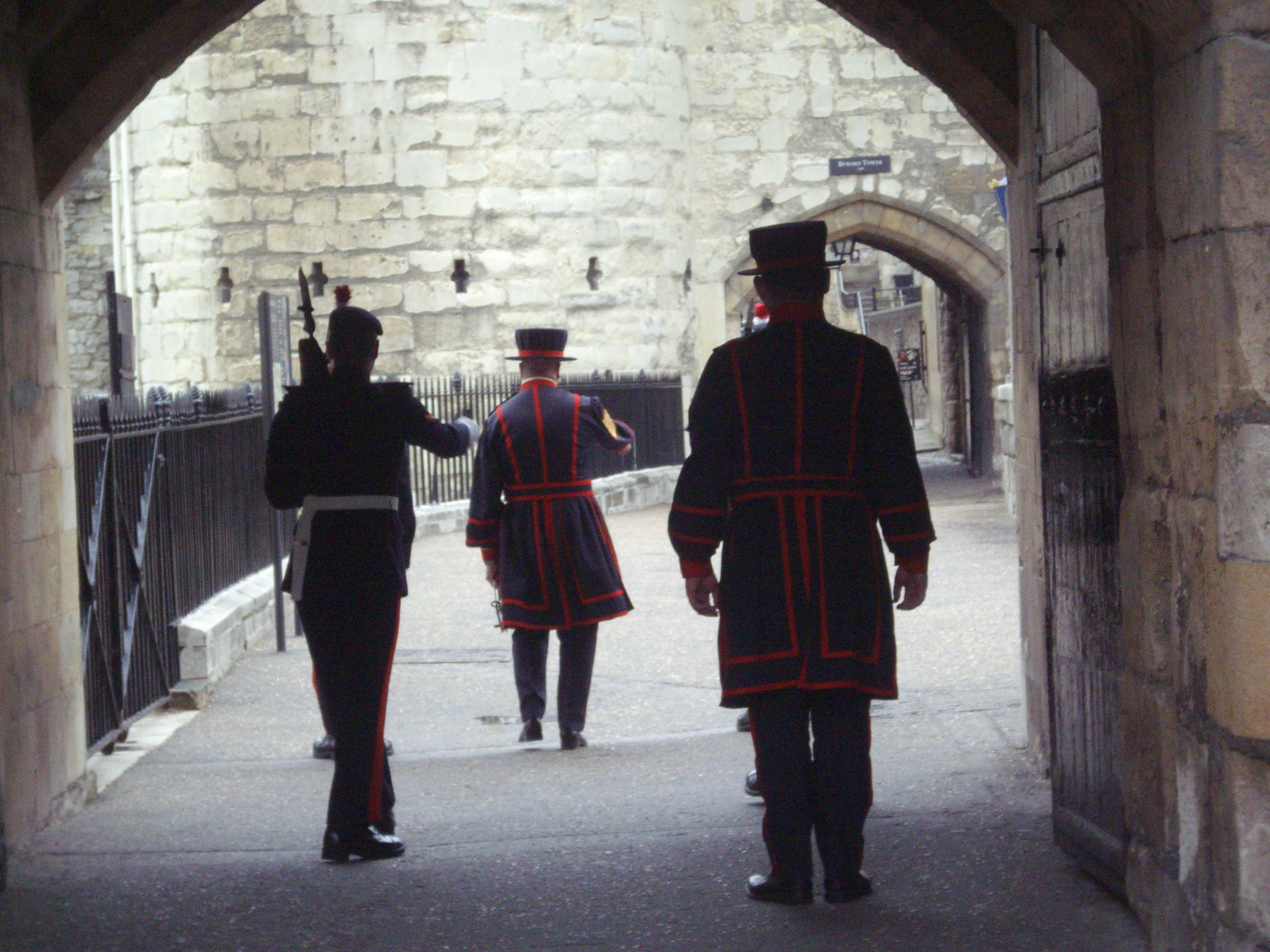
A Yeoman Warder (centre) is escorted by a sentry (left) of the Tower of London Guard.

In addition to the King's Guard, the Household Division also mans the Tower of London Guard, who is also responsible for providing the guard at the Tower of London. As the Tower is still officially a royal residence and is also the location of the crown jewels, it remains the Army's obligation to guard it. The Tower guard numbers one officer, three NCOs and ten soldiers, and usually posts a sentry outside the Jewel House and one outside the King's House. As the protection of the Tower is their responsibility (in conjunction with the Yeoman Warders), the guard must also see it is secure at night (see Ceremony of the Keys).

==== The Bank Picquet ====
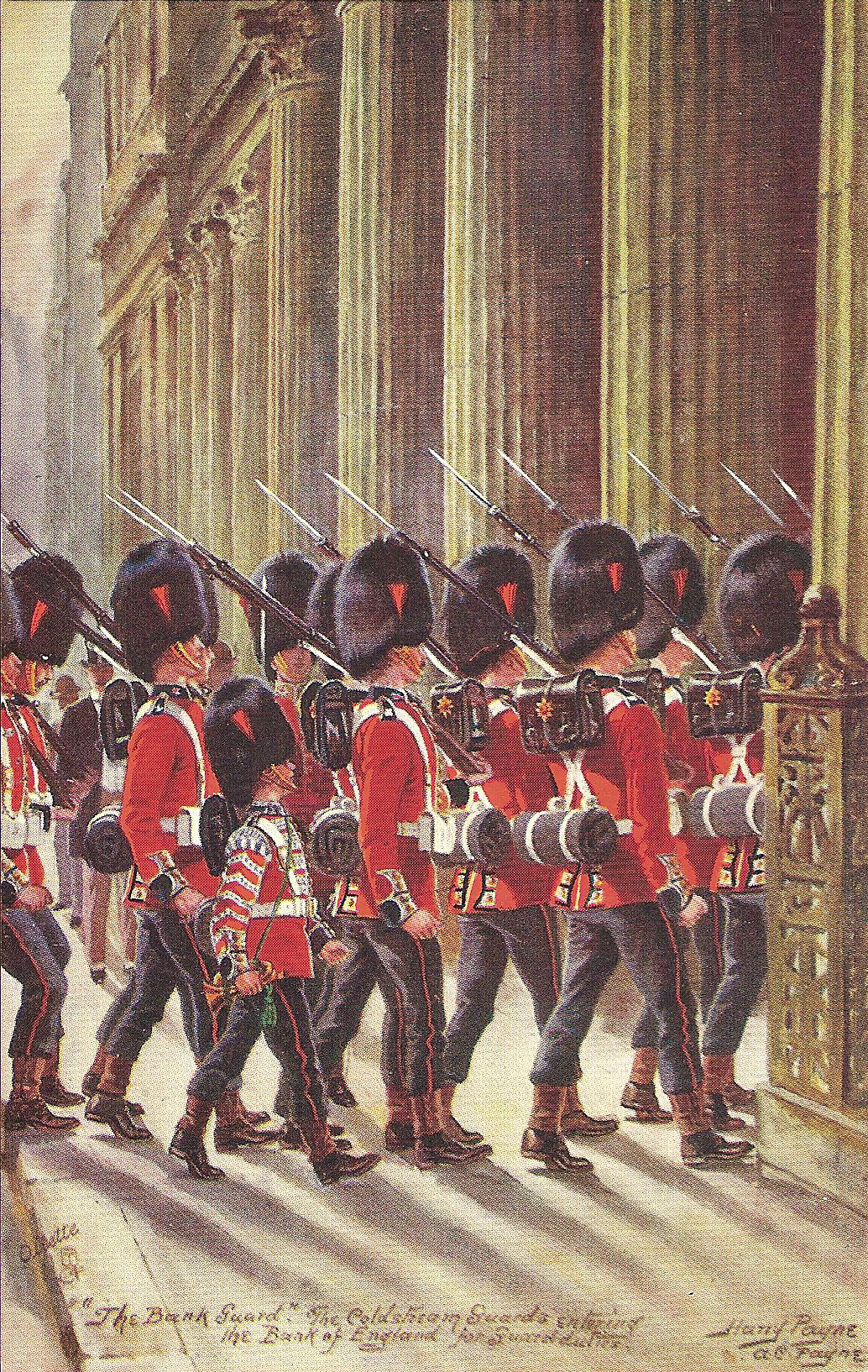
A Coldstream Guards detachment arriving at the Bank of England for guard duty in 1906

During the Gordon Riots in 1780, a detachment of the Foot Guards successfully defended the Bank of England from a violent mob. Thenceforth the bank paid for a detachment of soldiers, usually provided by the Brigade of Guards, to defend the Bank. From 1780, the detachment marched from their barracks, initially from the Tower of London, later Wellington or Chelsea Barracks, though in bad weather the detachment would be sent by a normal train of the London Underground.

With a guard mount at 3 pm, each guard consisted of one officer, one sergeant, one corporal, one lance corporal, eight guardsmen and a drummer; originally the guard had thirty guardsmen.

Once at the bank, there were two sentry posts, one outside the Counting House Parlour and another outside the bullion vaults. The officer was given half a bottle of port and the right to invite a friend or two to dinner in the bank. The other ranks were given a pint of beer with their dinner and one brand new shilling, two for a sergeant, to buy tea and a cake in the canteen. The Guard wore plimsolls in the Bank.

From 1963, the Bank Picquet travelled by vehicle clad in service dress and armed with automatic weapons, with the emphasis on security moving from ceremonial to tactical deployment. Improved security features and armed police made the guard unnecessary, and the service ended on the evening of 31 July 1973.

=== Windsor ===
One of the public duties battalions or incremental companies is responsible for providing the Windsor Castle Guard. The location of the ceremony at Windsor varies; in the Easter, when the King is in residence it usually takes place on the lawn in the castle's quadrangle. In wet weather or winter, to protect the lawn, or when the King is not holding court at Windsor Castle, the ceremony occurs outside the guardroom by Henry VIII's Gateway at the foot of Castle Hill.

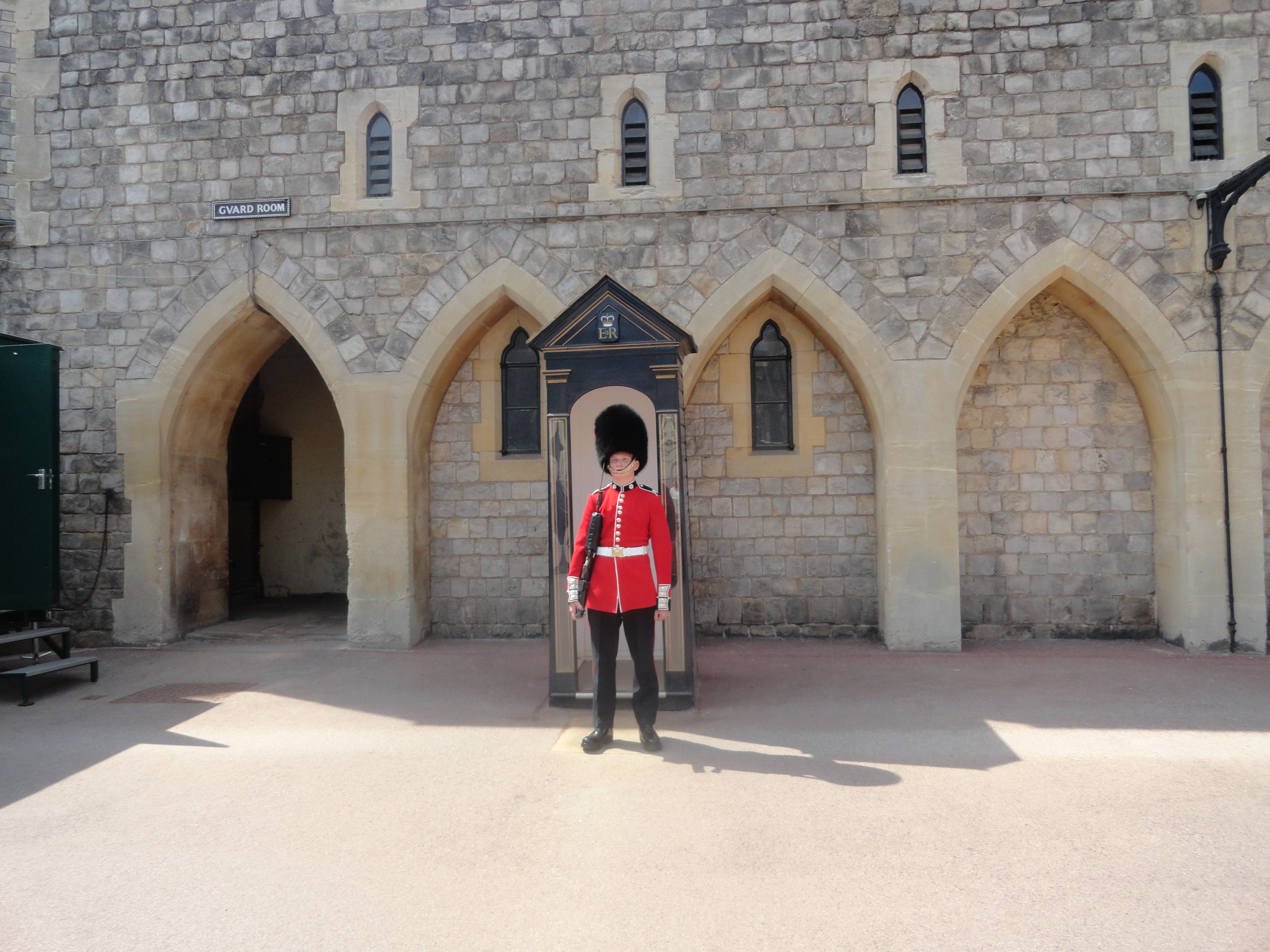
A sentry manning his post at Windsor Castle, 2011

The ceremony for changing the Windsor Guard is broadly the same as that which takes place at Buckingham Palace. At 10:40 am, the new guard marches from Victoria Barracks, through Windsor and turns left, going up Castle Hill to enter the Lower Ward. During Easter, and when the King is holding court at the castle, the guards change in the Upper Ward on the grass.

When changing guard in the normal way, the new guard arrives at roughly 11 am when the old guard has formed up outside the guardroom. Once both guards and the duty band (there is no duty band on Sundays) are present, the old guard and new guard will present arms to each other, interspersed by bugle calls – the officers will then go towards each other and symbolically touch left hands to 'hand over the keys to the castle (though no actual keys are handed over anymore). The guards will then slope arms and the reliefs will be formed up to go around the castle and change the sentries – during this process, the band typically plays a selection of music. Once the relief returns, the old guard forms back up ready to march back to Victoria Barracks. The band leads them out whilst the new guard presents arms. Once the old guard has left, the new guard is dismissed to the guardroom where they will be based for the next 24/48 hours – every two hours, the guard relief will march out and change the sentries.

=== Edinburgh ===
Sentry posts are mounted at Palace of Holyroodhouse and at Edinburgh Castle. Although the Household Division's primarily operates in London and Windsor, the Scots Guards have mounted these postings when the sovereign is in Edinburgh.

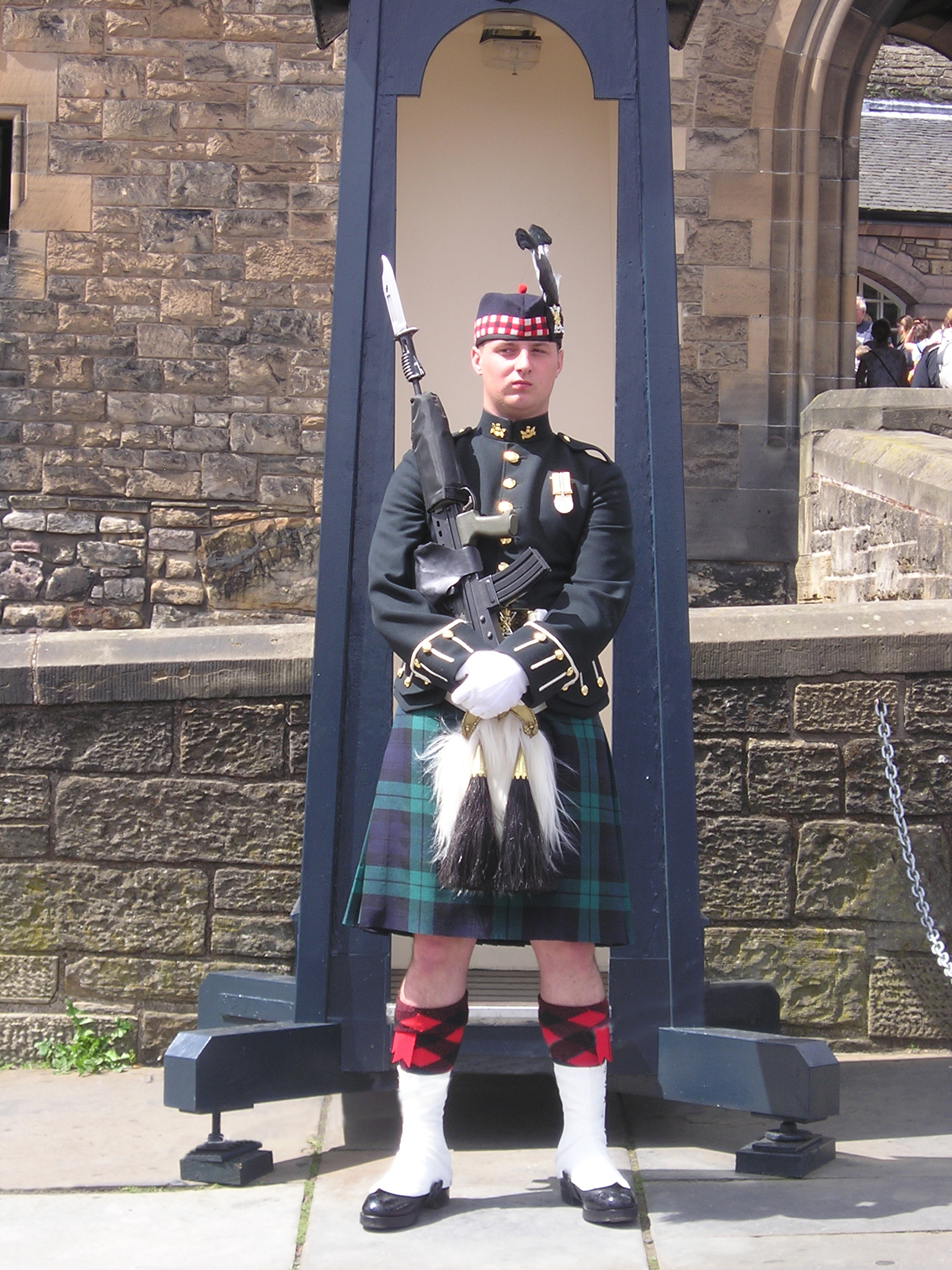
A sentry of the Royal Regiment of Scotland posted on the Esplanade outside Edinburgh Castle

These sentry postings are also mounted at other times of the year, including Lord Commissioner's Week, and the month of the Royal Edinburgh Military Tattoo. These sentries may also sometimes serve as the guard of honour for the Royal Edinburgh Military Tattoo. As there is no guard battalion permanently based in the city, sentries are provided by whichever resident infantry battalion is at Redford Barracks.

In the 1950s, horses from the Queen's Life Guard performing in the Tattoo were stabled at Powderhall Stables in Broughton, Edinburgh, with the soldiers being barracked in the nearby Hepburn House drill hall on East Claremont Street.

Until 2001, sentries were permanently posted on the Esplanade at the entrance of the castle, ostensibly as the guards to the Honours of Scotland housed inside. The sentries were changed every hour. However, cutbacks in the size of the army led to the permanent castle guard being abolished. As part of the reorganisation of the infantry following the 2003 defence review, the 1st and 2nd Battalions, Royal Regiment of Scotland (the Royal Scots Borderers and Royal Highland Fusiliers) were permanently based in Edinburgh, rotating between 19 Light Brigade or 52 Infantry Brigade. Whichever battalion is assigned to the 52 Brigade was responsible for performing public duties in Edinburgh. As part of the 2010 defence review, further reforms to the infantry led to the reduction of the 5th Battalion, Royal Regiment of Scotland to an incremental company (similar to the three companies of foot guards stationed in London) which is now a public duties unit permanently based in Scotland.

== See also ==
- Guard of honour
- Protective security unit
- Royal guard
