= James Alexander Russell =

Scottish physician

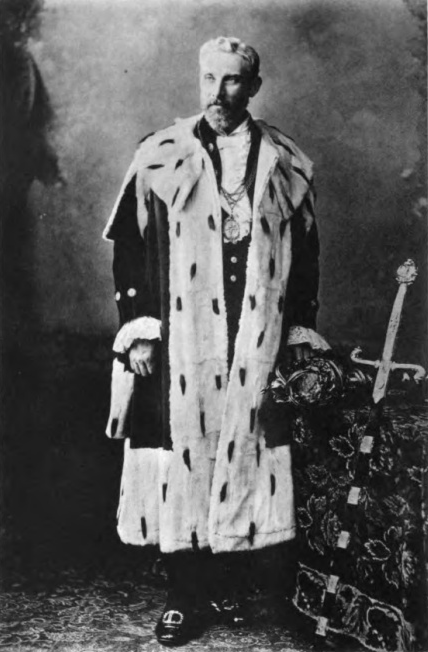
Sir James A Russell, Lord Provost Edinburgh

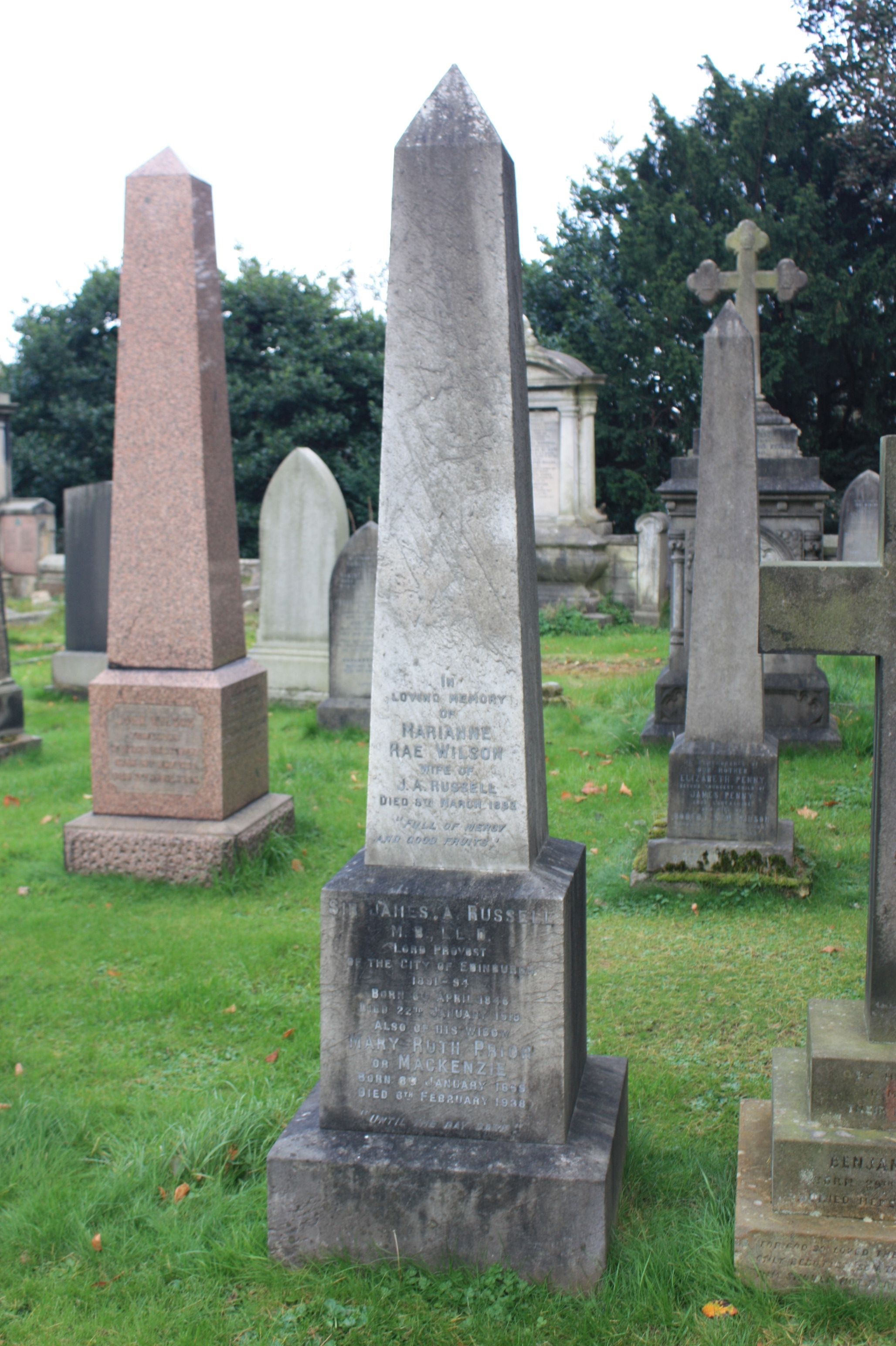
The grave of Sir James Russell, Dean Cemetery

Sir James Alexander Russell FRSE FRCPE (6 April 1846 in Glassellan House, Skye – 22 January 1918 in Edinburgh) was a Scottish physician who served as Lord Provost of Edinburgh (1891–94). He was a pioneer in the development of public health services.

== Life ==
He was born in the manse at Kilmodan the eldest of the eight children of Madeline Munro and her husband, Rev Alexander Fraser Russell (1814–1892), a Free Church of Scotland minister.

He was educated at Stronafian Free Church School. He then attended the University of Edinburgh, studying medicine and graduating with MB CM in 1868. He then took a degree in Public Health, graduating with a BSc in 1875. In 1876 he became a demonstrator in the Anatomy Department, dissecting bodies during lectures.

In 1877 he made a strange change in career in began lecturing in the Theory of Plumbing at what was then Heriot-Watt College in Edinburgh. This focused on the health aspects of drainage and clean water supplies.

In 1880 he was elected a Fellow of the Royal Society of Edinburgh. His proposers were Sir William Turner, Alexander Crum Brown, Andrew Douglas Maclagan, and Sir John Murray.

In 1880 he became a Councillor in Edinburgh and was made a Bailie in 1885. The city made him Lord Provost in 1891.

In 1893, he visited the newly built Powderhall Stables building and Powderhall Destructor, saying "I do not think that any district in the city where public work of this kind had to be performed should have anything like ugly-looking creations planned in its midst, each locality so situated being entitled, in his opinion, to claim three things in respect to refuse destructors: 1) that there should be no smoke; 2) that there should be no smell; and 3) that the buildings themselves should be pleasing to the eye."

He was knighted by Queen Victoria in 1894 and received an honorary doctorate (LLD) from the University of Edinburgh in the same year. In 1894 he was also elected a member of the Harveian Society of Edinburgh.

He died at home, Woodville House on Canaan Lane (south of Newbattle Terrace) in south-west Edinburgh and is buried in Dean Cemetery in Edinburgh in the central southern section with both his wives.

== Family ==
In 1876, he married Marianne (or Marion) Rae Wilson, daughter of the late James Wilson FRSE (1795–1856) who lived then at her father's house, Woodburn on Canaan Lane. She died in 1882. In 1897, he married a widow, Mrs Mary Ruth MacKenzie (née Prior).
