= Powderhall Stables =

Former stable block in Powderhall, Edinburgh

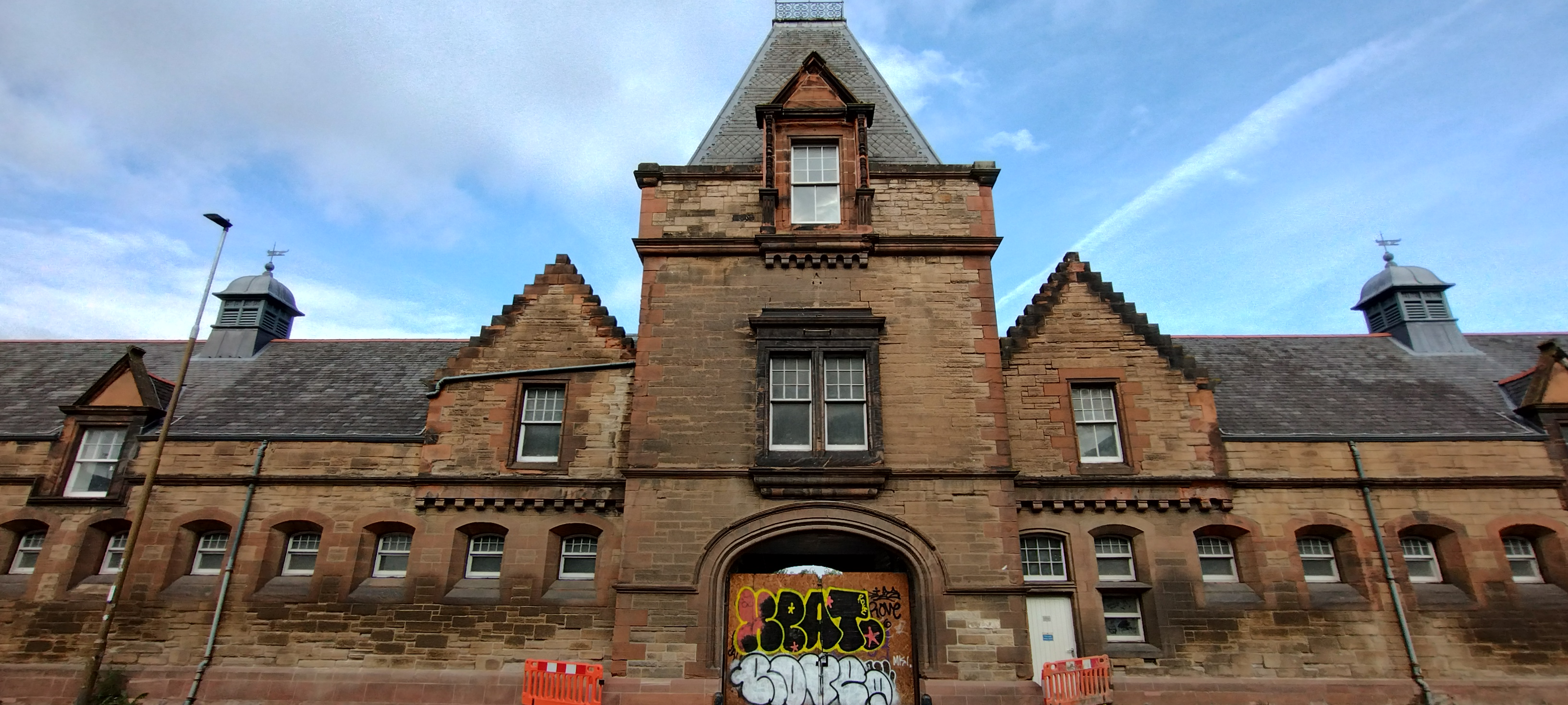
- Powderhall Stables in 2025.
- Interactive map of the Powderhall Stables area

General information
- Architectural style: Scots Baronial
- Location: 165A Broughton Road, Edinburgh, Scotland
- Coordinates: 55.966968°N 3.188899°W
- Grid reference: NT2588675523
- Opened: 1893
- Renovated: 2021
- Client: Edinburgh Corporation
- Owner: City of Edinburgh Council

Technical details
- Material: Sandstone

Design and construction
- Architect: John Aitken Cooper

Renovating team
- Architect: Collective Architecture
- Structural engineer: David Narro Associations
- Services engineer: RSP
- Quantity surveyor: Currie & Brown
- Main contractor: Sharkey; Ashwood Scotland

Listed Building – Category B
- Official name: 165 Broughton Road
- Designated: 23 July 1993
- Reference no.: LB30290

Powderhall Stables is a former stable block on Broughton Road in the Powderhall neighbourhood of Edinburgh in Scotland, United Kingdom.

== History ==
Designed by Burgh Engineer of Edinburgh John Aitken Cooper for the Edinburgh Corporation, the stable block was formally opened on 13 September 1893 by Lord Provost of Edinburgh James Alexander Russell. The stable block formed part of the wider Powderhall Refuse Disposal Works centred on the "Powderhall Destructor", a 10-cell incinerator. It was used to stable 20 horses that pulled the city's fleet of waste carts, bringing rubbish to the Destructor for incineration. It also housed offices, workshops (including a smithy, cartwright, and saddlers shop), and haylofts. Steam from the Destructor was used to drive an electric light plant which illuminated the stable block.

The stable block is a building in the Scots Baronial style, featuring "squared and snecked cream sandstone with red polished ashlar dressings" and "base course; segmental-arched windows at ground floor; cornice over ground floor; crowstepped gables; bartizans with pepperpot roofs to outer pavilion blocks". Other features include a "depressed-arched carriage entrance"; a "pedimented Renaissance detailed dormerheaded window"; and a "French pavilion roof with alternating bands of fishscale, diamond and standard slates". Upon opening, it was described in The Scotsman as being "more suggestive of a public school than a refuse destructor". The Buildings of Scotland: Edinburgh describes it as "Scots baronial. Symmetrical with red sandstone dressings, central tower and lots of pepperpots."

In 1914, the department of John Gibson, Inspector of Lighting and Cleansing for the City of Edinburgh, had its offices in the stable block.

In the 1950s, the stable block was used to stable horses from the Queen's Life Guard performing in the Edinburgh Tattoo.

The stable block ceased to be used as stables in the 1950s with the move to a motorised fleet. It was adapted into office and welfare space for Council staff. It was significantly refurbished in the 1970s with the loss of most original internal features. In 1985, incineration ceased at the Powderhall Refuse Disposal Works and it became the Powderhall Waste Transfer Station, compacting waste for dispatch to landfill. In 1993, the stable block was category 'B' listed by Historic Scotland. In 1999, an interpretation centre/visitor centre for school pupils illustrating the workings of the Powderhall Waste Transfer Station was added.

In 2016, the Powderhall Waste Transfer Station was closed due to equipment failures. By 2020, the stable block was in poor condition, with damage to areas including the stonework, roof, rainwater goods, windows, and chimneys.

In August 2020, plans for the refurbishment of the stable block into work and events space were submitted. The plans proposed the creation of a mix of 12 individual studios and two co-working spaces in the former stable bays and hayloft; two function rooms in the former workshops; and an outdoor square for hosting events such as street markets and outdoor exhibitions in the former stable yard. The refurbishment was designed by Collective Architecture, with the wider design team including Currie & Brown (project management and quantity surveying), David Narro Associates (structural engineering), and RSP Consulting Engineers (mechanical and electrical engineering).

The refurbishment commenced in June 2021 with Sharkey as principal contractor. It was part-funded by the Scottish Government's Regeneration Capital Grant Fund and City Centre Recovery Fund, Miller Homes' Bonnington Micro Business Fund, and Edinburgh World Heritage, along with funding from the City of Edinburgh Council's own City Strategic Investment Fund.

In November 2022, the Council agreed to lease the stable block upon completion of the refurbishment works to the arts charity Out of the Blue Arts and Education Trust. Completion of the refurbishment was delayed by challenges with making utility connections. In January 2026, the building was handed over to Out of the Blue to test "infrastructure, systems and processes". In February 2026, a "Red Wheel" plaque was unveiled on the building by the National Transport Trust.
