= Canadian declaration of war on Germany =

1939 announcement

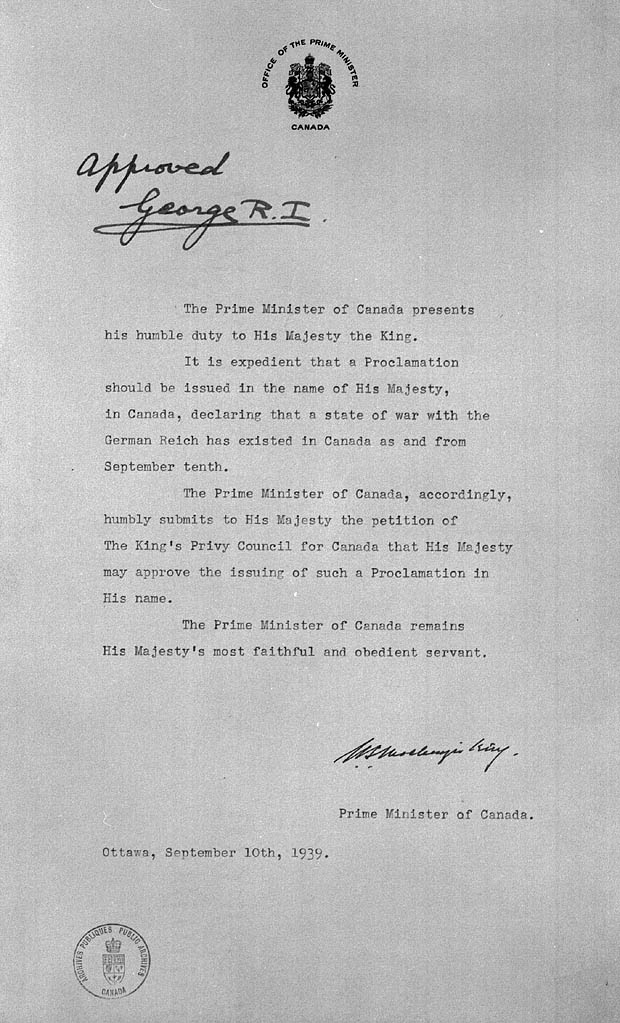
Prime Minister Mackenzie King's request to King George VI for approval that war be declared against Germany, 10 September 1939

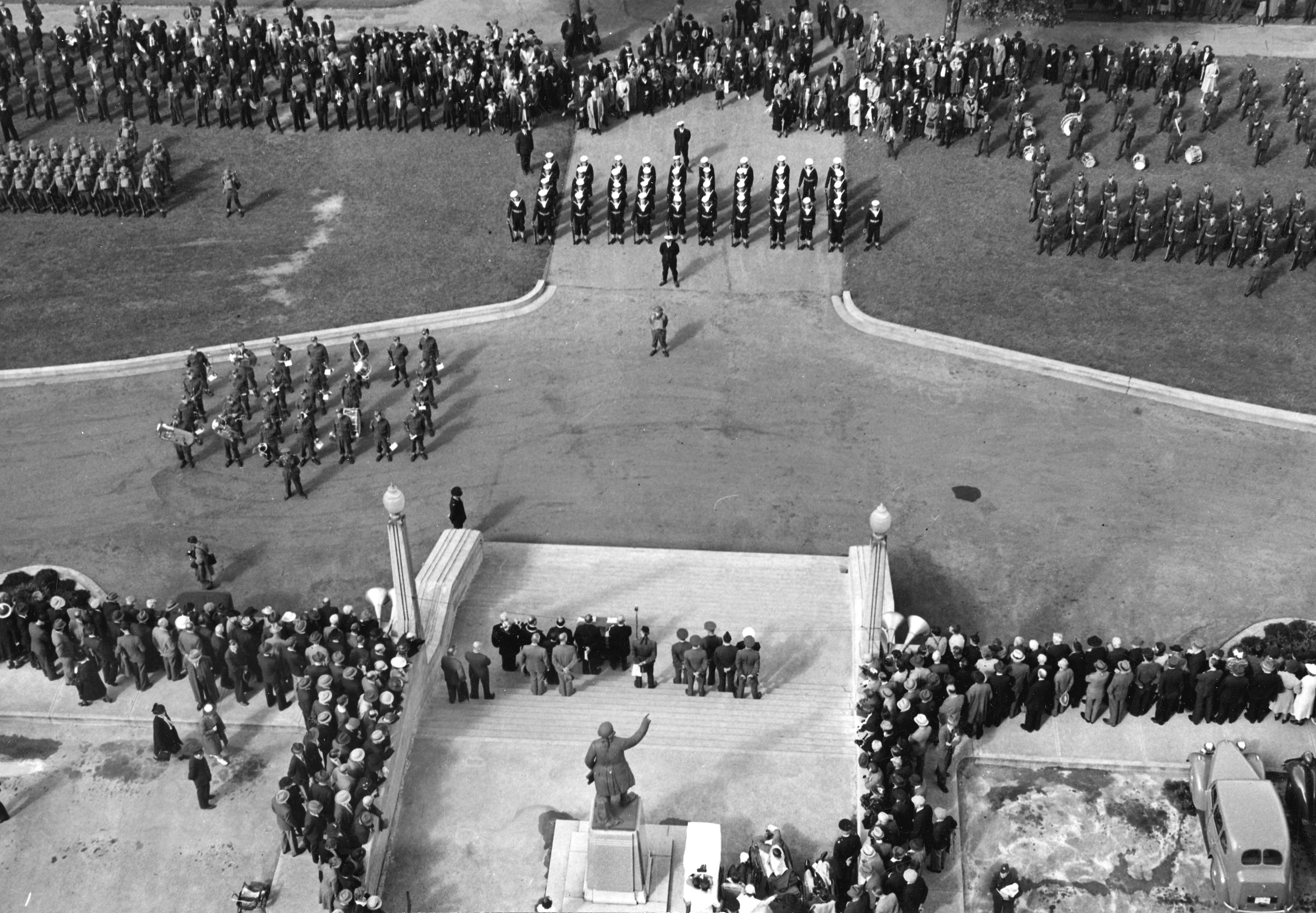
The lieutenant governor of British Columbia announcing Canada's entry into the war on 10 September 1939

A declaration of war by Canada against Germany was made by order-in-council signed by George VI, King of Canada, on 10 September 1939, seven days after the United Kingdom and France had also entered a state of war with the Nazi regime. The royal proclamation of the Canadian declaration was published in the Canada Gazette.

Canadian Prime Minister William Lyon Mackenzie King announced the recommendation for a declaration of war in a radio-broadcast speech, made from Ottawa, on 3 September 1939. The matter was then debated in Parliament, though declaration of war is a matter of the royal prerogative and does not require parliamentary approval.

== Background and procedure ==
Canada did not declare war on Germany at the outset of the First World War, as it had no authority to do so at the time. Though the Canadian Parliament did debate the matter and an order-in-council was issued proclaiming Canada was at war, the country, being part of the British Empire, entered the war with the United Kingdom in consequence of the latter's declaration of war 4 August 1914.

Prime Minister William Lyon Mackenzie King at the German Chancellery in Berlin, 29 June 1937

In the aftermath of the First World War, Adolf Hitler rose to power as the Führer of Nazi Germany. The Prime Minister of Canada, William Lyon Mackenzie King, visited Hitler on 29 June 1937, during which both indicated a desire to avoid war. But, Mackenzie King did express to Hitler that Canada and other nations were concerned by Germany's rapid armament, which Hitler blamed on the Treaty of Versailles, a pact he had violated by sending troops into the Rhineland on 7 March 1936. The Prime Minister further informed the Führer that, if a war broke out between Germany and Britain, Canada would be at Britain's side. Mackenzie King also met President of the Reichstag Hermann Göring, who, more ominously, asked Mackenzie King if Canada would support Britain if the latter initiated a conflict over a then-hypothetical unification of Germany and Austria. In response, Mackenzie King said it would depend on the circumstances. What the Prime Minister had told his British counterpart, Neville Chamberlain, when in London in May 1937 was more certain: Canada would be with Britain should an international conflict erupt.

While Mackenzie King still hoped for peace, due to Nazi Germany's pattern of military build-up and violation of treaties, King formed the opinion that a war might break out between Britain and Germany, and if so, his government would have Canada once again fighting alongside Britain.

With that possibility clear in the public's mind, many Canadians, and the government too, were relieved when the Munich Agreement was signed on 30 September 1938, giving Czechoslovakia’s Sudetenland to Germany. For a time, this pact seemed to appease Hitler and avoid war.

By the beginning of the following year, the uneasiness that had persisted despite the Munich Agreement was apparent, and Mackenzie King began psychologically preparing Parliament for Canada going to war. In his speech on 16 January 1939, he quoted Wilfrid Laurier from 1910: "if Britain is at war, we are at war, and liable to attack". These words triggered a negative reaction within Cabinet. Minister of Justice Ernest Lapointe threatened to resign and asserted the Prime Minister's statement went against the Statute of Westminster 1931, which, in combination with the Balfour Declaration of 1926, had "established that the United Kingdom and the Dominions were now autonomous in domestic or external affairs"; Canada in 1939 had "the option of making its own decision."

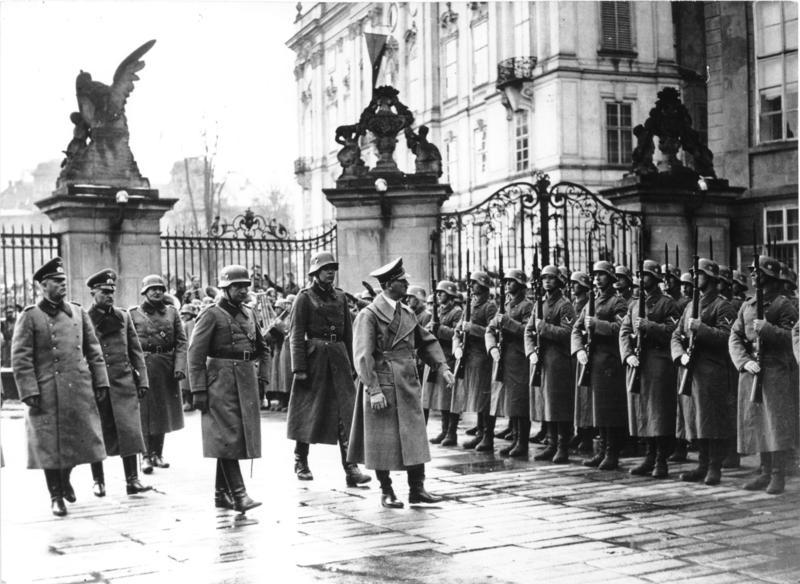
Adolf Hitler at Prague Castle, 15 March 1939

But after Germany disregarded the Munich Agreement and invaded parts of Czechoslovakia on 15 March 1939, Mackenzie King vacillated on the certainty of Canada's involvement in a British-German war. He told the House of Commons on 20 March that Canada would go to Britain's aid if bombs fell on London, but not necessarily before that. Ten days later, he said the idea of Canada going to war, only 20 years after the last world war, was "sheer madness". But he also said the government would reject neutrality. He told the British Parliament in April that he could not predict Canada's course of action, should Britain go to war even if it was attacked. Cabinet minister Lapointe stated Canada's participation or non-participation in any conflict would be based on its own self-interest. The Canadian media and much of the public viewed this position favourably.

Germany invaded Poland on 1 September 1939, and the United Kingdom and France declared war on 3 September. At first, Mackenzie King and Lapointe asserted in the House of Commons that Canada was bound by the British declaration, even without any explicit Canadian statement of support of the George VI's edict of 3 September. They said they believed Canada was at war, but how much the country would be contributing to the war was up to the Canadian government. Their position changed after Canada was not included in the list of belligerent states in the declaration of neutrality promulgated by President of the United States Franklin D. Roosevelt on 5 September, making it seem that Canada was not supporting the United Kingdom in its war. The Canadian Parliament was not scheduled to return until 2 October but was recalled by the Governor General early, on 7 September, to consider a declaration of war. Canada's political leaders used this moment to assert Canada's independence from the UK, as already established by the Statute of Westminster.

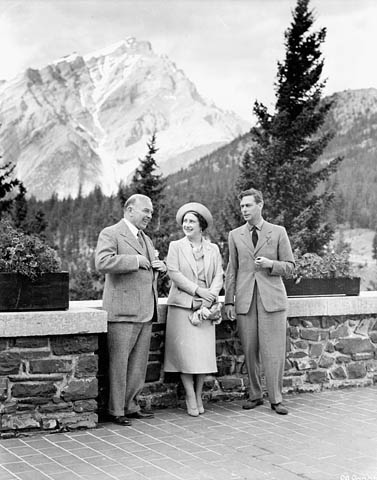
King George VI (right) and his wife, Queen Elizabeth (centre), with Prime Minister Mackenzie King (left) in Banff, Alberta, 27 May 1939

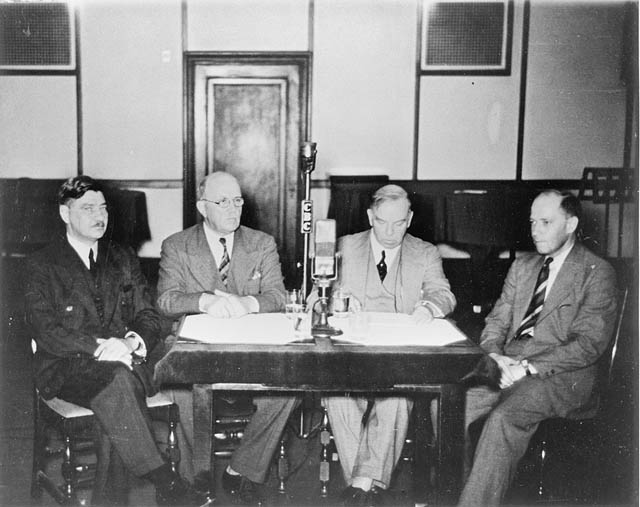
(Left to right) C.G. Power, E. Lapointe, Prime Minister W.L.M. King, and N.M. Rogers broadcasting a message to Canadians following the emergency Cabinet meeting that took place after Britain's declaration of war, 3 September 1939

The throne speech, read by Governor General the Lord Tweedsmuir, to open the new session, presented the Cabinet's proposal for taking the country to war and associated measures. The address in reply was given and debated. The Senate passed a motion to adopt the address in reply on 9 September. The House of Commons discussed the matter until also adopting the motion later that same day.

The following day, the Cabinet issued an order-in-council stating that Canada was at war with Germany. Vincent Massey, Canada's high commissioner to the United Kingdom, brought the document to King George VI, at the Royal Lodge, Windsor Great Park, for his signature, whereupon Canada had officially declared war on Germany. In his capacity as the government's official recorder for the war effort, Leonard Brockington noted: "King George VI of England did not ask us to declare war for him—we asked King George VI of Canada to declare war for us." The time difference between Britain's and Canada's entry into the conflict was partly intended to demonstrate Canada's sovereignty.

As 10 September was a Sunday, the order-in-council was tabled in the House only on the following day, when the Prime Minister told that chamber that the Cabinet had issued the order shortly after the motion had been adopted and that the government had been informed, at 11:15 a.m., on 10 September, that the King had granted his approval of the proclamation.

These were significant developments, as they became examples for other Dominions to follow and, by the war's end, F.R. Scott concluded, "it is firmly established as a basic constitutional principle that, so far as relates to Canada, the King is regulated by Canadian law and must act only on the advice and responsibility of Canadian ministers."

The state of war was ended by another royal proclamation issued in 1951.

== Documents ==
=== Prime Minister King's speech ===
Below is the speech, given by William Lyon Mackenzie King during the debate on the address in reply on September 8, 1939:

Recommendation of Canadian Declaration of War on Germany

For months – indeed for years – the shadow of impending conflict in Europe has been ever present. Through these troubled years no stone has been left unturned, no road unexplored in patient search for peace.

Unhappily for the world, Herr Hitler and the Nazi regime in Germany have persisted in their attempt to extend their control over other peoples and countries, and to pursue their aggressive designs in wanton disregard of all treaty obligations, and peaceful methods of adjusting international disputes. They have had to resort increasingly to agencies of deception, terrorism and violence. It is this reliance upon force, this lust for conquest, this determination to dominate throughout the world which is the real cause of the war that today threatens the freedom of mankind.

The fate of a single city, the preservation of the independence of a particular nation are the occasion, not the real cause, of the present conflict. The forces of evil have been loosed in the world in a struggle between the pagan conception of a social order which ignores the individual and is based upon the doctrine of might and a civilization based upon the Christian conception of the brotherhood of man, with its regard for the sanctity of contractual relations and the sacredness of human personality.

As President Roosevelt said on opening Congress on January 4: "There comes a time in the affairs of men when they must prepare to defend, not their homes alone, but the tenets of faiths and humanity on which their churches, their Governments, and their very civilizations are founded. The defense of religion, of democracy, and of good faith among nations is all the same fight. To save one we must make up our minds to save all."

This, I believe, is the position in which all nations that cherish free institutions, individual liberty and social justice find themselves today.

I need not review the events of the last few days. They must be present in the minds of all. Despite her unceasing efforts to preserve the peace of Europe, the United Kingdom has today, in the determination to honour her pledges and meet her treaty obligations, become involved in war.

This morning the King [George VI], speaking to his peoples at home and across the seas, appealed to all to make their own the cause of freedom, which Britain again has taken up. Canada has already answered that call. On Friday last, the Government, speaking on behalf of the Canadian people, announced that in the event of the United Kingdom becoming engaged in war in the effort to resist aggression, they would, as soon as Parliament meets, seek its authority for effective cooperation by Canada at the side of Britain.

As you are aware, I have all along felt that the danger of war was such that Parliament should not be dissolved, but be available to consider any emergency that might arise. Parliament will meet Thursday next. Between now and then all necessary measures will be taken for the defense of Canada. Consultations with the United Kingdom will be continued. In the light of all the information at its disposal, the government will then recommend to Parliament the measures which it believes to be the most effective for cooperation and defence.

That Parliament will sanction all necessary measures, I have not the least doubt. Already I have received from the Leader of the Opposition [Robert James Manion], and from representatives of the other parties in the House of Commons, assurances of their full appreciation of the gravity of the situation, and of their desire to see that such measures are adopted as in the present crisis will best serve the national interest.

Our first concern is with the defence of Canada. To be helpful to others, we must ourselves be strong, secure and united. In anticipation of a state of war, the Government has already availed itself of the provisions of the War Measures Act, to take essential measures for the defense of our coasts, our land and our people. As has already been announced, the militia of Canada, the naval service and the air force are already on active service.

This morning these measures were supplemented by others including the proclamation of the Defence of Canada Regulations. Measures have also been taken to prevent profiteering in the necessaries of life. Of the latter measures my colleague, the Minister of Labour, will speak to you in a moment. In what manner and to what extent Canada may most effectively be able to cooperate in the common cause is, as I have already stated, something which Parliament itself will decide. All I need to add at the moment is that Canada, as a free nation of the British Commonwealth, is bringing her cooperation voluntarily. Our effort will be voluntary.

The people of Canada will, I know, face the days of stress and strain which lie ahead with calm and resolute courage. There is no home in Canada, no family, and no individual whose fortunes and freedom are not bound up in the present struggle. I appeal to my fellow Canadians to unite in a national effort to save from destruction all that makes life itself worth living, and to preserve for future generations those liberties and institutions which others have bequeathed to us.

=== Royal proclamation ===
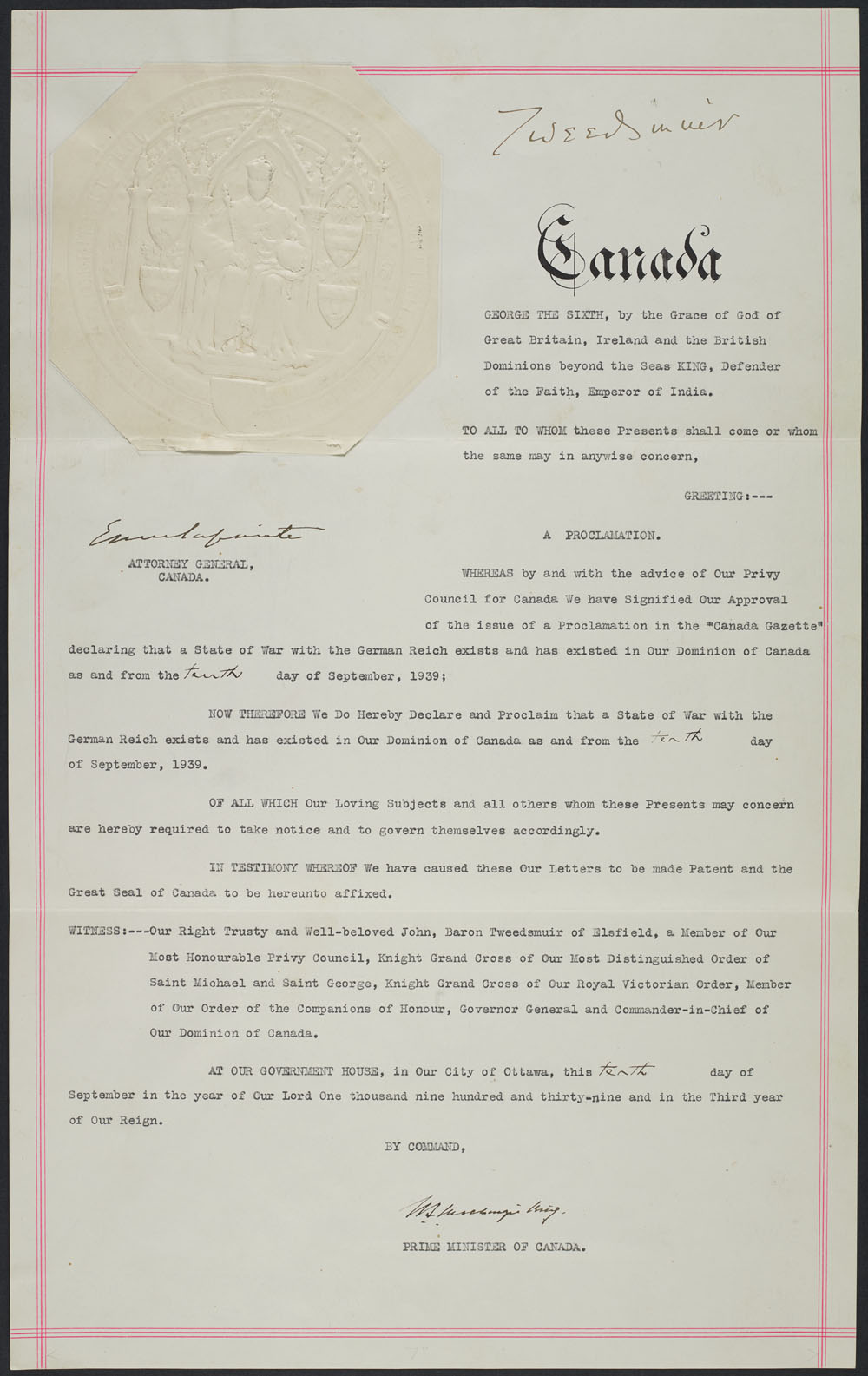
The proclamation of George VI, king of Canada, "declaring that a state of war with the German Reich exists and has existed in our dominion of Canada as and from the tenth day of September, 1939". The Great Seal of Canada is affixed above the Attorney General's signature and the signature of the Governor-General, the Lord Tweedsmuir, is at the top as a witness.

The following proclamation was published in the Canada Gazette, Canada's official publication of record, the morning following Canada's declaration of war on Nazi Germany.

The Canada Gazette
PROCLAMATION

TWEEDSMUIR,

[L.S.]

CANADA

GEORGE THE SIXTH, by the Grace of God, of Great Britain, Ireland and the British Dominions beyond the Seas KING, Defender of the Faith, Emperor of India. (Note: The style and title used here was determined by the British Royal and Parliamentary Titles Act 1927. The act struck the phrase United Kingdom of before Great Britain. The current style and title of the Canadian sovereign was determined by Canadian law in 1953.)

TO ALL WHOM these Presents shall come or whom the same may in anywise concern.

GREETING:

A PROCLAMATION

WHEREAS by and with the advice of Our Privy Council for Canada We have signified Our Approval of the issue a Proclamation in the Canada Gazette declaring that a State of War with the German Reich exists and has existed in Our Dominion of Canada as and from the tenth day of September, 1939;

NOW THEREFORE We do hereby Declare and Proclaim that a State of War with the German Reich exists and has existed in Our Dominion of Canada as and from the tenth day of September, 1939.

OF ALL WHICH Our Loving Subjects and all others whom these Presents may concern are hereby required to take notice and govern themselves accordingly.

IN TESTIMONY WHEREOF We have caused these Our Letters to be made Patent and the Great Seal of Canada to be hereunto affixed. WITNESS: Our Right Trusty and Well-beloved John, Baron Tweedsmuir of Elsfield, a Member of Our Most Honourable Privy Council, Knight Grand Cross of Our Most Distinguished Order of Saint Michael and Saint George, Knight Grand Cross of Our Royal Victorian Order, Member of Our Order of the Companions of Honour, Governor General and Commander-in-Chief of Our Dominion of Canada.

AT OUR GOVERNMENT HOUSE [Rideau Hall], in Our City of Ottawa, this tenth day of September, in the year of Our Lord one thousand nine hundred and thirty-nine and in the Third year of Our Reign.

By Command.

W. L. MACKENZIE KING

Prime Minister of Canada.

== See also ==
- Declaration of war by Canada
- Monarchy of Canada and the Canadian Armed Forces
- Declarations of war during World War II
- Diplomatic history of World War II
- British declaration of war on Germany (1939)
- United States declaration of war on Germany (1941)
- War Measures Act
