= Canadian Coronation Contingent =

Military participants in the London ceremony

The Coronation Standard for Canada, used in the coronations of King George VI and Queen Elizabeth II

The Canadian Coronation Contingent (French: Contingent canadien au couronnement) were members from the Canadian military and the Royal Canadian Mounted Police, who were assembled for the sole purpose of participating in the coronation ceremonies of the Canadian monarch in London, United Kingdom. Five Coronation Contingents have been mounted: in 1902, 1911, 1937, 1953, and 2023.

== 1902 coronation ==
The Canadian military contingent for the coronation of Edward VII and Alexandra was commanded by Lieutenant-Colonel Henry Pellatt of the 2nd Regiment Queen's Own Rifles of Canada and consisted of some 600, including veterans of the Battle of Paardeberg. The group arrived at Liverpool on 20 June 1902 and were given an "immense reception" by the local people. They camped with other Dominion and colonial troops at Alexandra Palace, in north London.

On 24 June it was announced that the King was ill and that the coronation would be postponed indefinitely. The colonial troops were inspected by the Prince of Wales, later to be King George V, before the Canadian contingent left London on 3 July for the journey home via Liverpool. A second, smaller contingent was sent for the rescheduled coronation on 9 August 1902.

== 1911 coronation ==
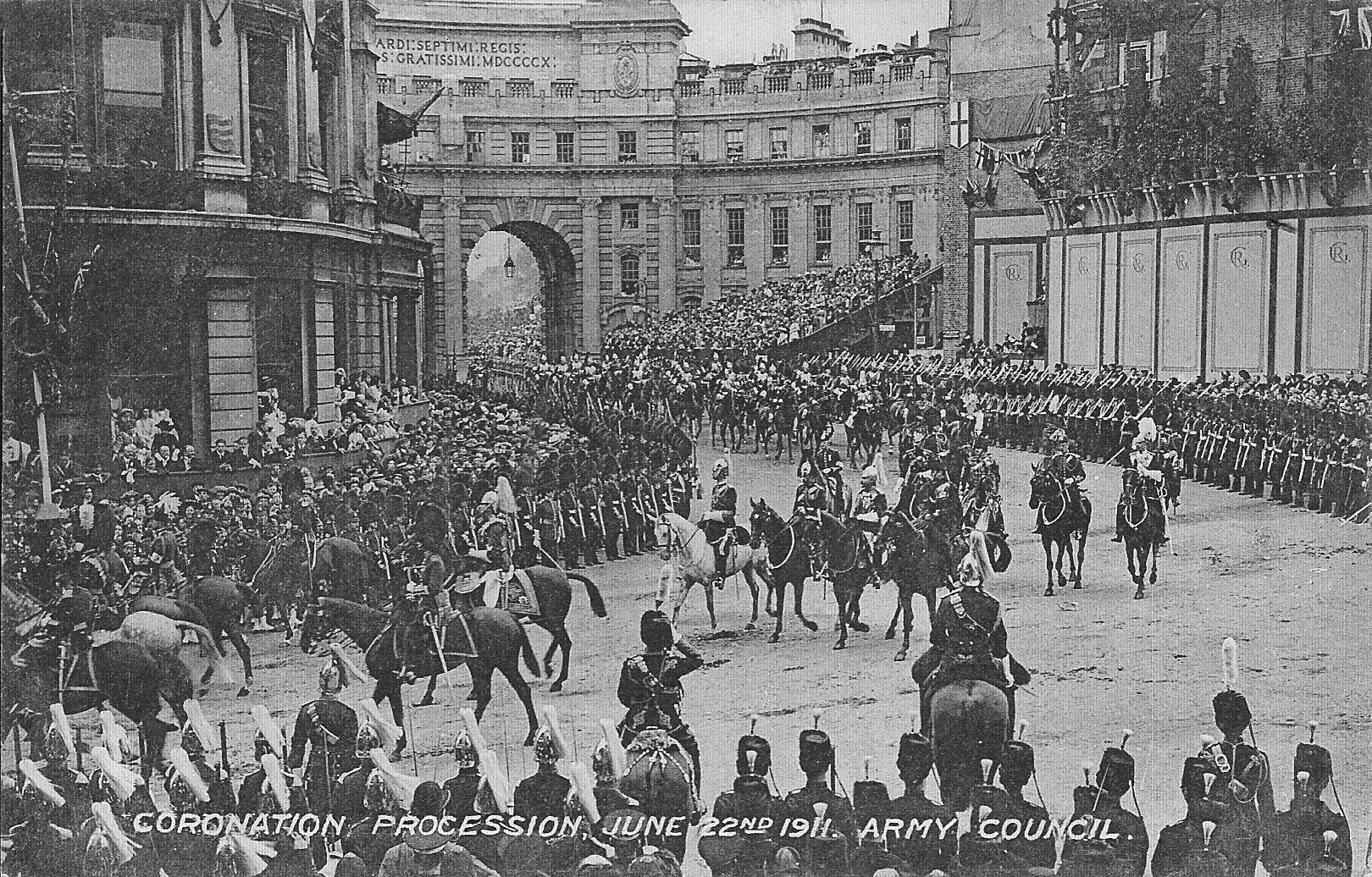
The coronation procession of King George V in 1911

The Canadian contingent for the coronation of George V and Mary was a force of 708, of which 53 were officers. The Contingent mustered at Lévis, Quebec, on 23 May 1911, sailing for England on 2 June and arriving at Liverpool on 9 June. The contingent was based at the Duke of York's Royal Military School where they were inspected by Prince Arthur, Duke of Connaught and Strathearn and Frederick Roberts, 1st Earl Roberts. On Coronation Day, 22 June, eight officers and forty men were part of the procession, while the remainder of the Canadian Contingent lined the route. The next day, two mounted guards participated in the King’s Procession. The contingent sailed from Liverpool on 2 July, returning to Quebec City on 9 July.

== 1937 coronation ==
For the coronation of George VI and Elizabeth, Canada sent a contingent of 351 representing the Navy, Air Force and Royal Canadian Mounted Police who each provided about 30 men, with the Army providing the balance.

The contingent gathered at Lansdowne Park at Ottawa and sailed from Montreal on 28 April, arriving at Southampton on 7 May. They were initially based at Pirbright Camp for training, before moving to the Olympia London exhibition hall. During their stay in London, they provided the King's Guard at Buckingham Palace and St James Palace. Following the coronation, they were presented with the King George VI Coronation Medal at Wellington Barracks, before leaving from Southampton on 26 May.

== 1953 coronation ==
For the coronation of Elizabeth II, Canada sent the largest contingent of any Commonwealth realm; 180 men marched in the procession, while 320 lined the route in the area near Canada House. In total, there were some 700 active members of the Canadian military involved. Many of the Canadian troops were based with NATO in Germany; but, horses were sent direct from Canada for the Royal Canadian Mounted Police contingent, who rode with the Canadian Army, while four others formed an escort for the Prime Minister of Canada, Louis St. Laurent, and his wife.

Canada’s high commissioner, Norman Robertson, had a ceremonial role, handing the Canadian standard to the Barons of the Cinque Ports in the nave of the abbey, before taking his seat.

== 2023 coronation ==
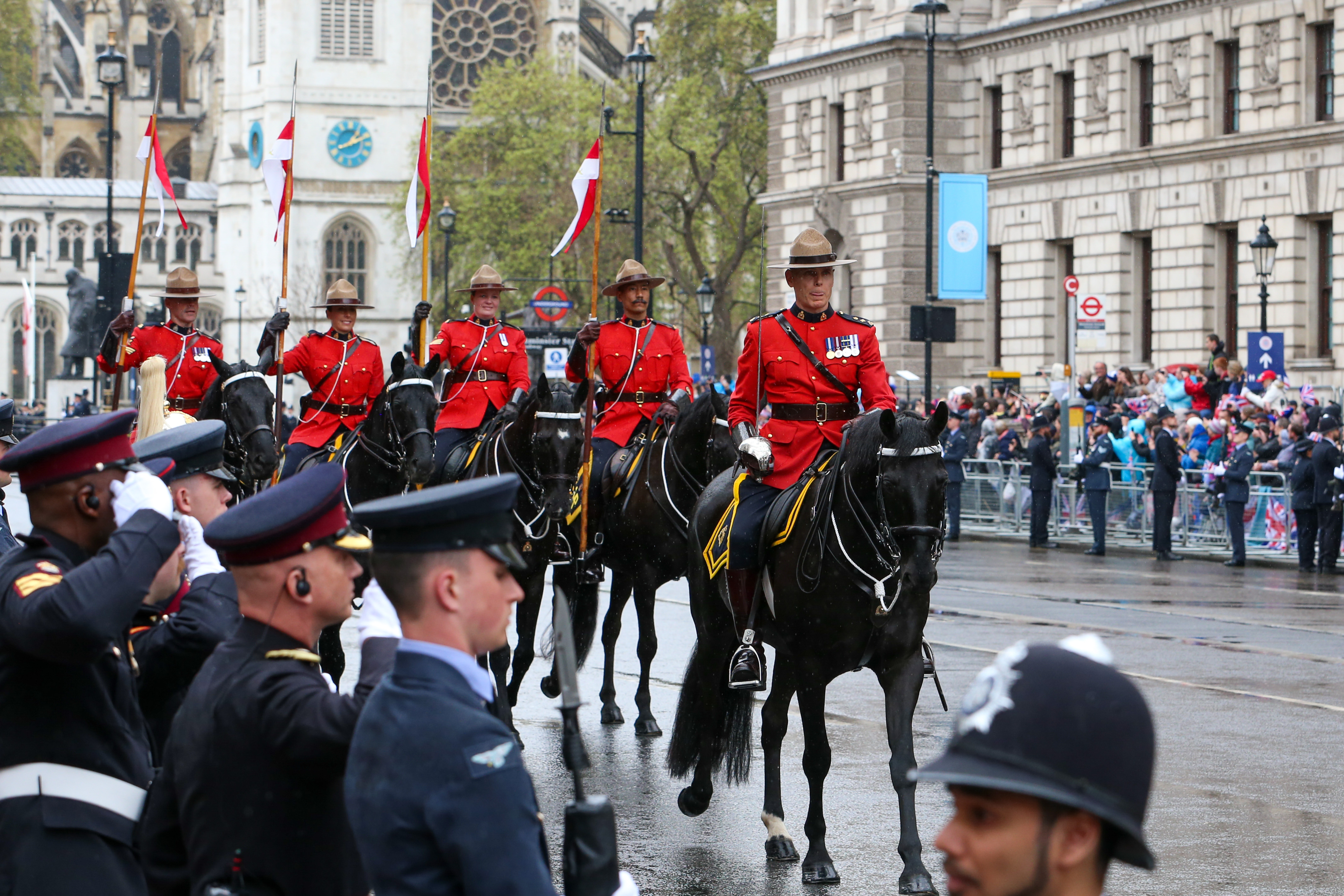
Members of the RCMP at the coronation of Charles III

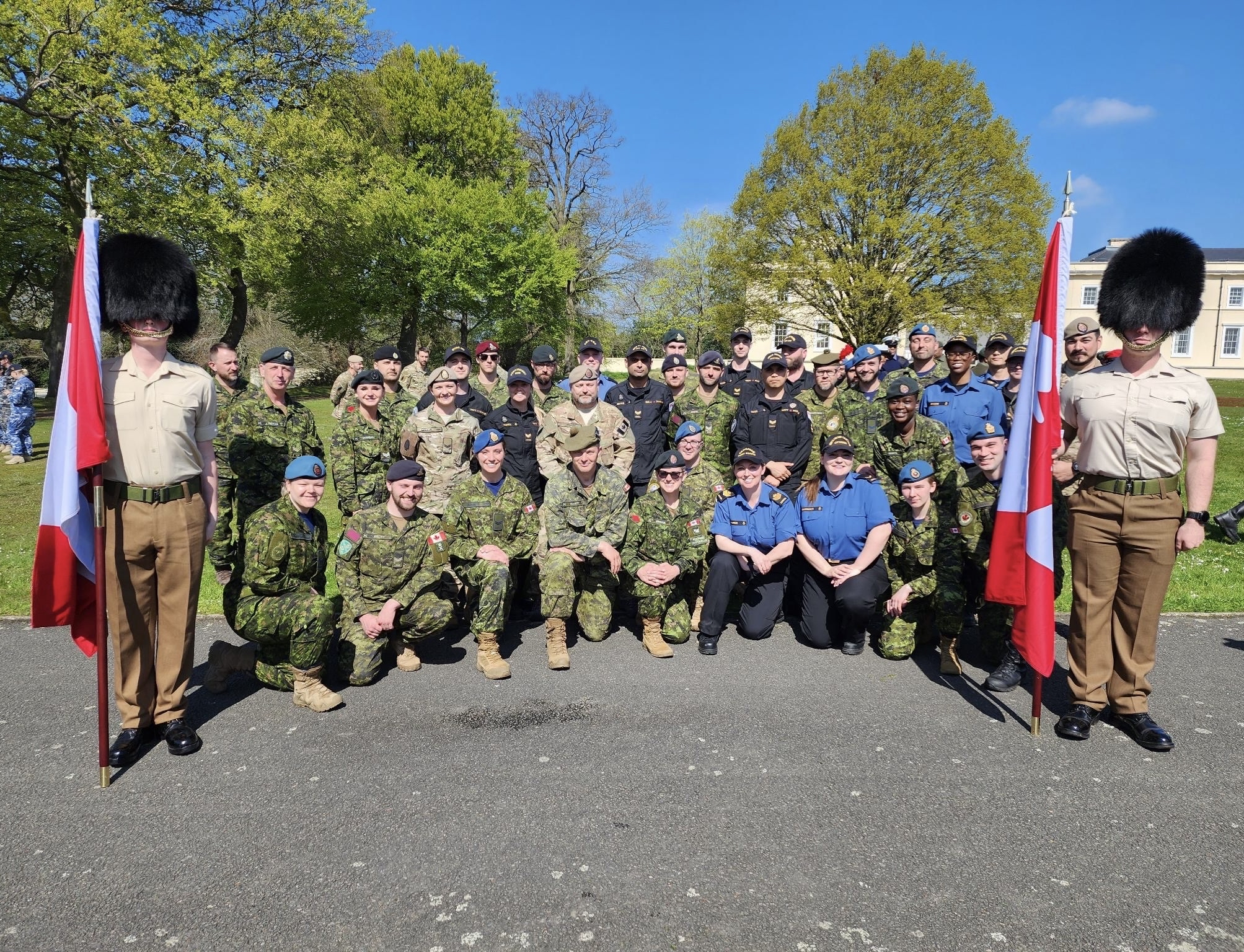
Members of the Canadian marching contingent pose with two Grenadier Guards holding Canadian flags during a coronation procession rehearsal at RMA Sandhurst

A Canadian Coronation Contingent took part in the procession for the coronation of Charles III and Camilla on 6 May 2023. Canada's delegation, which was housed at Army Training Centre Pirbright, was the largest in the Commonwealth division of 408 military personnel. Commanded by Lieutenant Colonel Mike Mendyka of the Royal Canadian Regiment, it included 45 members from the Canadian Armed Forces: 16 from the Canadian Army, 11 from the Royal Canadian Navy, 11 from the Royal Canadian Air Force, six from the Canadian Special Operations Forces Command, and a naval cadet from the Royal Military College of Canada. Two CAF members marched alongside the coach carrying the King and Queen to Buckingham Palace.

The coronation contingent also included five riders from the Royal Canadian Mounted Police's Musical Ride, who accompanied the Household Cavalry to form part of the King's escort in the post-coronation procession from Westminster Abbey to Buckingham Palace. Each RCMP officer rode horses gifted by the RCMP to Elizabeth II and Charles III.

== See also ==
- King’s Guard
- Monarchy of Canada and the Canadian Armed Forces
