= Commander-in-Chief of the Canadian Armed Forces =

Supreme commander of the Canadian Armed Forces

- Commandant en chef des Forces armées canadiennes
- Badge of the Canadian Armed Forces

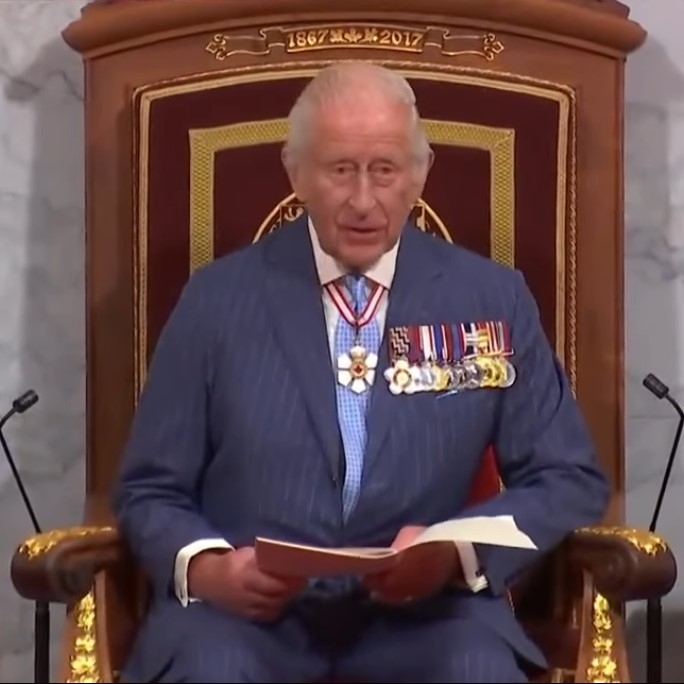
- Incumbent; Charles III; King of Canada since 8 September 2022 Represented by Louise Arbour; Governor General of Canada since 8 June 2026
- Canadian Armed Forces
- Type: Role
- Abbreviation: C-in-C
- Constituting instrument: Constitution Act, 1867; Letters Patent, 1947
- Formation: 1 July 1867
- First holder: Queen Victoria
- Deputy: Chief of the Defence Staff

The commander-in-chief of the Canadian Armed Forces (French: Commandant en chef des Forces armées canadiennes) exercises supreme command and control over Canada's military, the Canadian Armed Forces. Constitutionally, command-in-chief is vested in the Canadian monarch, currently King Charles III. Since the Letters Patent, 1947, were signed by King George VI, the governor general of Canada—presently Louise Arbour—executes most of the duties of the sovereign, including in their role as commander-in-chief. Consequently, the governor general also uses the title Commander-in-Chief of the Canadian Forces. By protocol, the title used within international contexts is Commander-in-Chief of Canada.

== Constitutional provisions, title, and delegation ==
The Constitution Act, 1867, states that "the Command-in-Chief of the Land and Naval Militia, and of all Naval and Military Forces, of and in Canada, is hereby declared to continue and be vested in the Queen." However, beginning in 1904, the exercise of the duties of the commander-in-chief were delegated to the governor general of Canada, the monarch's representative in the country. The Militia Act from that year stated, "the Command-in-Chief of the Militia is declared to continue and be vested in the King, and shall be administered by His Majesty or by the Governor General as his representative." Following this, in 1905, the letters patent constituting the Office of the Governor General were amended to read: the "Letters Patent constituting the Office of the Governor General and Commander-in-Chief."

Throughout the development of the armed forces, the monarch has remained vested with command-in-chief, while the governor general's title altered to suit the changes in the militia's structure. Following the passage of the Naval Service Act establishing the Royal Canadian Navy in 1910, the viceroy was styled Commander-in-Chief of the Militia and Naval Forces and, after the creation of the Royal Canadian Air Force in 1918, as Commander-in-Chief of the Militia and Naval and Air Forces. Following this, the Letters Patent, 1947, issued by King George VI, referred to the "Office of Governor General and Commander-in-Chief in and over Canada." In 1968, following the unification of the Royal Canadian Navy, the Canadian Army, and the Royal Canadian Air Force, the commander-in-chief became the most senior officer of the Canadian Armed Forces.

As all executive power is legally reposed in the Crown, the role of commander-in-chief is the only constitutional means by which decisions are made over the deployment and disposition of the Canadian Armed Forces. Under the Westminster system's conventions of responsible government, the cabinet—which advises the sovereign or his viceroy on the exercise of the executive powers—generally exercises the Crown prerogative powers relating to the Canadian forces. Still, all declarations of war are issued with the approval, and in the name, of the monarch and must be signed by either the sovereign or the governor general, as was done with the proclamation that declared Canada at war with Nazi Germany, issued on September 10, 1939; it stated: "Whereas by and with the advice of Our Privy Council for Canada, We have signified Our Approval for the issue of a Proclamation in the Canada Gazette declaring that a State of War with the German Reich exists and has existed in Our Dominion of Canada as and from the tenth day of September, 1939."

In exercising the duties of commander-in-chief, the governor general appoints the chief of the Defence Staff, as well as royal colonels-in-chief of Canadian regiments (save for the monarch himself); approves new military badges and insignia (except for those bearing St Edward's Crown, which may only be sanctioned by the sovereign); visits Canadian forces personnel within Canada and abroad; bestows honours, decorations, and medals; and signs commission scrolls. Since 2000, the governor general also awards the Commander-in-Chief Unit Commendation to units in the Canadian Forces and allied militias that have performed extraordinary deeds or activities in highly hazardous circumstances in active combat. An insignia pin is presented to members and the unit receives a scroll and may fly a special banner.

== Governor general's rank insignia ==
According to Canadian Forces Dress Instructions, the governor general may wear the uniform and corresponding cap/hat badge of a flag/general officer, with a special flag/general officer sleeve braid embellished with the governor general's badge, and a large embroidered governor general's badge on the shoulder straps, facing forward.

Royal Canadian Navy		Canadian Army		Royal Canadian Air Force
Board	Sleeve	Board	Sleeve	Board	Sleeve

== Commanders-in-chief of the Canadian Armed Forces ==
Year	Sovereign	Year	Represented by Governor General
Commanders-in-Chief of the Canadian Land and Naval Militia
1867–1901	Queen Victoria	1898–1904	The Earl of Minto
1901–1910	King Edward VII	1904–1910	The Earl Grey
Commanders-in-Chief of the Canadian Militia and Naval Forces
1910–1919	King George V	1910–1911	The Earl Grey
1910–1919	King George V	1911–1916	Prince Arthur, Duke of Connaught and Strathearn
1910–1919	King George V	1916–1919	The Duke of Devonshire
Commanders-in-Chief of the Canadian Militia and Naval and Air Forces
1919–1936	King George V	1919–1921	The Duke of Devonshire
1919–1936	King George V	1921–1926	The Viscount Byng of Vimy
1919–1936	King George V	1926–1931	The Marquess of Willingdon
1919–1936	King George V	1931–1935	The Earl of Bessborough
1919–1936	King George V	1935–1936	The Lord Tweedsmuir
1936	King Edward VIII	1936	The Lord Tweedsmuir
1936–1952	King George VI	1936–1940	The Lord Tweedsmuir
1936–1952	King George VI	1940–1946	The Earl of Athlone
1936–1952	King George VI	1946–1952	The Viscount Alexander of Tunis
1952–1968	Queen Elizabeth II	1952	The Viscount Alexander of Tunis
1952–1968	Queen Elizabeth II	1952–1959	Vincent Massey
1952–1968	Queen Elizabeth II	1959–1967	Georges Vanier
1952–1968	Queen Elizabeth II	1967–1968	Roland Michener
Commanders-in-Chief of the Canadian Armed Forces
1968–2022	Queen Elizabeth II	1968–1974	Roland Michener
1968–2022	Queen Elizabeth II	1974–1979	Jules Léger
1968–2022	Queen Elizabeth II	1979–1984	Edward Schreyer
1968–2022	Queen Elizabeth II	1984–1990	Jeanne Sauvé
1968–2022	Queen Elizabeth II	1990–1995	Ramon John Hnatyshyn
1968–2022	Queen Elizabeth II	1995–1999	Roméo LeBlanc
1968–2022	Queen Elizabeth II	1999–2005	Adrienne Clarkson
1968–2022	Queen Elizabeth II	2005–2010	Michaëlle Jean
1968–2022	Queen Elizabeth II	2010–2017	David Lloyd Johnston
1968–2022	Queen Elizabeth II	2017–2021	Julie Payette
1968–2022	Queen Elizabeth II	2021–2022	Mary Simon
2022–present	King Charles III	2022–2026	Mary Simon
2022–present	King Charles III	2026-present	Louise Arbour

== See also ==
- Monarchy of Canada and the Canadian Armed Forces
- Colonel-in-Chief
