= Monarchy of Canada and the Canadian Armed Forces =

Relationship between the Canadian Crown and the Canadian Armed Forces

The relationship between the Canadian Crown and the Canadian Armed Forces is both constitutional and ceremonial, with the King of Canada being the commander-in-chief of the Canadian Forces and he and other members of the Canadian royal family holding honorary positions in various branches and regiments, embodying the historical relationship of the Crown with its armed forces. This construct stems from Canada's system of constitutional monarchy and through its 500 years of monarchical history, the relationship symbolically represented through royal symbols, such as crowns on military badges and insignia, coats of arms, royal portraits, and the grant of the royal prefix to various military units and institutions. The role of the Canadian sovereign within the Canadian Armed Forces is established within the Canadian constitution, the National Defence Act, and the King's Regulations and Orders (KR&Os) for the Canadian Forces.

== Role in command ==
The emblem of the Canadian Armed Forces topped by the Canadian Royal Crown to indicate from where the military's authority stems

The role of the Canadian Crown in the Canadian Armed Forces is established through both constitutional and statutory law. The Constitution Act, 1867. declares that command-in-chief of those Forces is "to continue and be vested in the Queen" and the National Defence Act states, "the Canadian Forces are the armed forces of Her Majesty raised by Canada". As the sovereign's representative, the governor general of Canada carries out the duties and bears the title Commander-in-Chief on the monarch's behalf. Since Canadian Confederation, three members of the royal family (apart from the sovereign) have been titled as commander-in-chief: John Campbell, Marquess of Lorne (1871–1883), Prince Arthur, Duke of Connaught and Strathearn (1911–1916), and the Earl of Athlone (1940–1946).

Formally, there is a direct chain of command from the monarch to the governor general, through the chief of the Defence Staff to all of the officers who hold the King's Commission, and, through them, to all members of the Canadian Forces. No other person, including the prime minister, other cabinet ministers, nor public servants is part of the chain of command; neither does any other person have any command authority in the Canadian Forces, an arrangement maintained to ensure that "the military is an agent for, and not a master of, the state." As such, all new recruits into the Canadian Forces are required to recite the Oath of Allegiance to the monarch. According to the National Defence Act, the use of traitorous or disloyal words towards the reigning king or queen is a service offence and may be punishable by up to seven years imprisonment. Neither the monarch nor the viceroy, however, involve themselves in direct military command; per constitutional convention, both must almost always exercise the royal prerogative on the advice of Cabinet; although, the right to unilaterally use those powers in crisis situations is maintained. (Note: See Note 1 at Cabinet of Canada.)

Declarations of war, the mobilisation of troops, and the organisation of the Forces all fall within the royal prerogative. Direct parliamentary approval is not necessary; though, the Cabinet may seek it, nonetheless, and the Crown-in-Parliament is responsible for allocating moneys necessary to fund the military. The monarch issues letters patent, known as the King's Commission, to commissioned officers in the Canadian Army, Royal Canadian Navy, and the Royal Canadian Air Force. Further, all regulations for the Canadian Forces are set out by the sovereign in the King's Regulations and Orders.

== Symbolism and traditions ==
The Canadian Forces have derived many of their traditions and symbols from the British Army, Navy, and Air Force, including those with royal elements. Contemporary icons and rituals, however, have evolved to include elements reflective of Canada and the Canadian monarchy. Members of the country's royal family also continue their two century old practice of maintaining personal relationships with the Canadian Forces, as well as individual units, around which the military has developed complex protocols.

=== Ceremonies and protocols ===
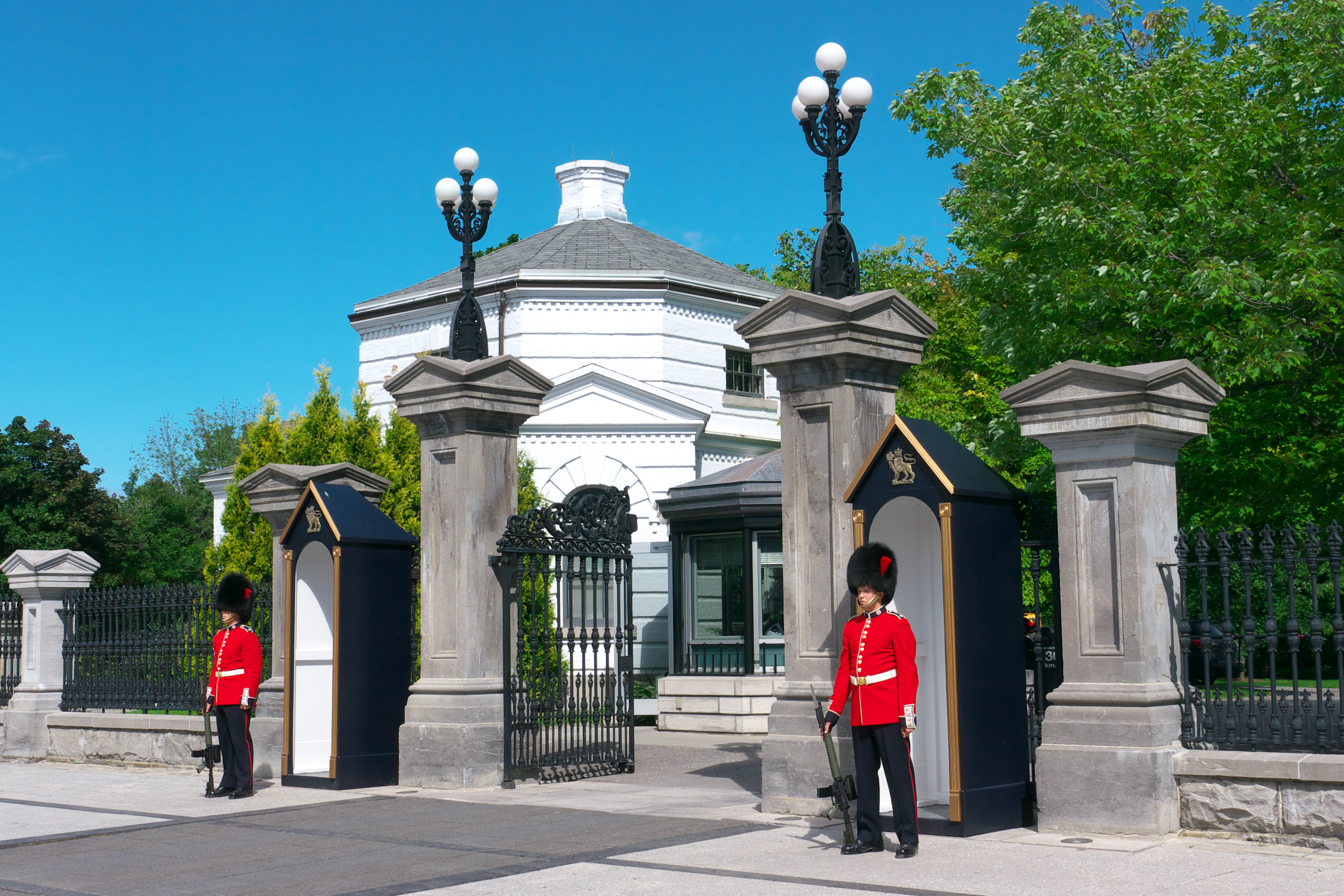
Members of the Governor General's Foot Guards performing public duties at Rideau Hall. The Guards are one of three units that comprise the Household Division.

Many ceremonies and rituals of the Canadian Forces have a royal connection. For example, the military traditionally mounts what is known as the King's Guard (or Queen's Guard during the reign of a female monarch), which is made up of contingents of infantry and cavalry soldiers who are charged with guarding the royal residences in Canada and the United Kingdom. Canada has mounted the King's/Queen's Guard 13 times since 1916, in addition to Canadian Coronation Contingents for every coronation of the country's monarch since that of Edward VII in 1902. Also, whenever the sovereign or a member of his family is in Ottawa, they will lay a wreath at the National War Memorial (which itself was dedicated in 1939 by King George VI) and will do the same if at a Canadian war monument overseas.

Three military units comprise the Household Division, charged specifically with protecting the monarch and governor general: the Governor General's Horse Guards, the Governor General's Foot Guards, and the Canadian Grenadier Guards.

Members of the royal family will also be present for other military ceremonies besides those related to any honorary ranks they hold, including inspections of the troops and anniversaries of key battles and victories, such as commemorations of D-Day. For these events, with participants following the official order of precedence. The royal anthem of Canada, "God Save the King", is normally played, as may be the Viceregal Salute for the governor general or lieutenant governor, if either is present. A loyal toast may also be given; it is required at all formal mess dinners and toasts the health of the monarch. Canadian Forces members and officers are required to stand during the toast and salute any time the royal anthem is played. This stipulation was challenged in 2008 by an officer of Princess Patricia's Canadian Light Infantry and upheld by the Canadian Forces Grievance Board, the Chief of the Defence Staff, and the Federal Court of Canada.

=== Visual markers ===
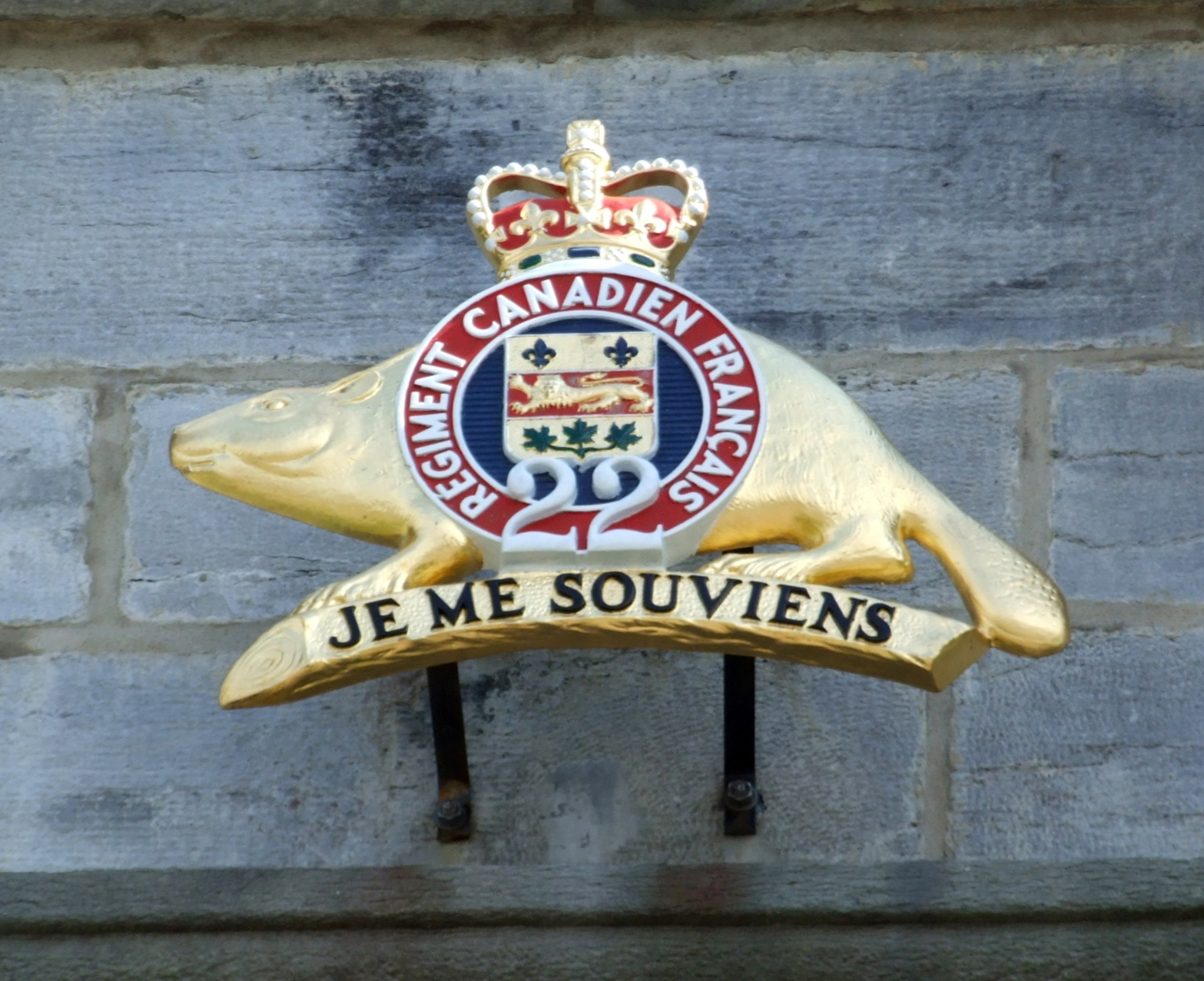
The emblem of the Royal 22^{e} Régiment at the Citadelle of Quebec, with St. Edward's Crown atop

To signify the sovereign's place at the head of the Canadian Forces, many badges include a crown. Originally designed by the British kings of arms, since 1968, they have been created by the Department of National Defence and then the Canadian Heraldic Authority. Each primary badge of a branch, formation, or unit must be approved by the governor general as commander-in-chief, since the monarch designated approval of new badges to the governor general in the mid-1980s; though, permission for use of royal titles and personal symbols such as the crown must be personally approved by the sovereign. The King's Canadian arms and his royal cypher are also displayed throughout the Forces, including on banners, badges, and military band instruments.

Unique king's colours and regimental colours are presented to various regiments, units, and commands, consisting mostly of national and royal symbols combined; they act as "visible symbols of pride, honour, and devotion to sovereign and country." Colours are thus consecrated objects; it is expected that everyone will rise to attention (if civilian) and salute (if military) upon a stand of uncased colours passing. Authorization to possess a king's colour may be granted and the colour presented only by the King, the governor general, or a lieutenant governor, and the colours must be dipped in the presence of the monarch or other members of the royal family.

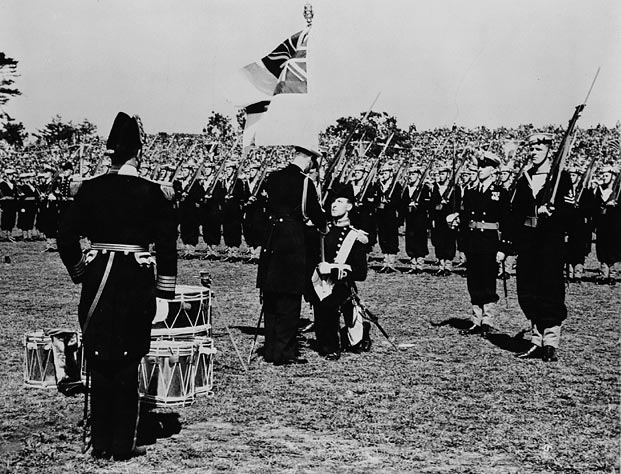
King George VI presents the King's Colours to the Royal Canadian Navy at Beacon Hill Park, Victoria, British Columbia, 1939. King's and regimental colours are typically given to infantry battalions and other units of the Canadian Forces.

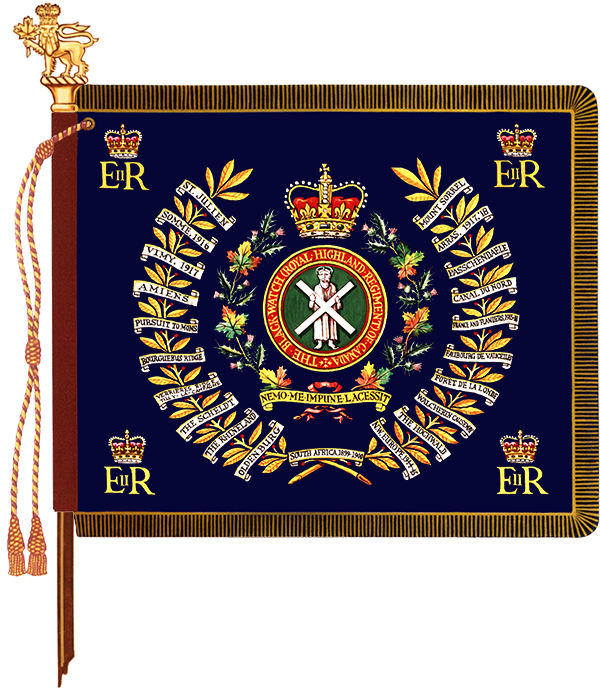
Regimental colour of the Black Watch (Royal Highland Regiment) of Canada, with the royal cypher of Elizabeth II, Queen of Canada, in each corner

Those in the royal family may also present a royal banner to a unit to commemorate specific services rendered and as a mark of royal favour. For example, Lord Strathcona's Horse (Royal Canadians) received a royal banner from King Edward VII for their combat in South Africa, and Queen Elizabeth the Queen Mother presented the Canadian Forces Medical Service with a royal banner in 1985. These typically include a mark unique to the royal individual, such as a cypher.

The King's harbourmaster, who is in charge of His Majesty's Canadian Dockyards, is accorded a flag that consists of a white-bordered national flag defaced in the centre with a white disc bearing a crown and the acronym KHM/CPSM, for King's Harbour Master/Capitaine de port de Sa Majesté.

The Royal Union Flag was approved by the federal Parliament in 1964 for "continued use as a symbol of Canada's membership in the Commonwealth of Nations and of her allegiance to the Crown." This flag however, is generally flown only on specified days and whenever instructed by National Defence Headquarters.

The finial capping the tip of a flagpole carrying the sovereign's flag for Canada, governor general's flag, king's colours, or other royal banners must be in the form of the crest of the royal coat of arms of Canada.

=== Royal designations ===
A number of regiments of the Canadian Army have been granted the use of the prefix royal in the regiment's name, while others bear the name of a member of the royal family. The royal prefix—termed a royal designation—is an honour that demonstrates royal favour for the organisation to whose name the prefix is applied. Its award is an exercise of the royal prerogative and does not expire unless revoked by the Crown-in-Council or the organisation that received the designation ceases to exist. If the name of the regiment should change after the prefix is granted, the word royal may be retained preceding the new name, such as when the Royal Northwest Mounted Police was renamed in 1920 as the Royal Canadian Mounted Police.

=== Honorary appointments ===
Members of the royal family, including the sovereign, take on honorary appointments—called royal appointments—related to Army regiments or Air Force or Navy units; a practice thought to have originated with the installation of Princess Louise, Duchess of Connaught, as Colonel-in-Chief of the 199th Battalion in 1917. Requests for a royal honorary are made by the regiment or unit through the chain of command and the appointment is made by the Crown-in-Council (the monarch or governor general acting on the advice of Cabinet). Positions include colonel-in-chief, captain general, commodore-in-chief, and admiral.

The appointee—known as an honorary—acts akin to a patron; intended as an honour for regiments and units and to reinforce loyalty to the Crown and a holder to be a "guardian of regimental traditions and history, promot[e] the regiment's identity and ethos, and [be] an advisor to the commanding officer on virtually all issues excluding operations." The royal individual holds the role either for life, until voluntarily stepping down, or the unit or regiment is disbanded. They will carry out a number of associated duties, such as attending regimental dinners, presenting new colours, trooping the colour, and viewing field training exercises. Attendance and participation in these events may be at the direction of the ministers of the Crown or the regiment itself. As members of the Canadian Forces, royal honoraries may wear Forces' uniforms, both dress and operational.

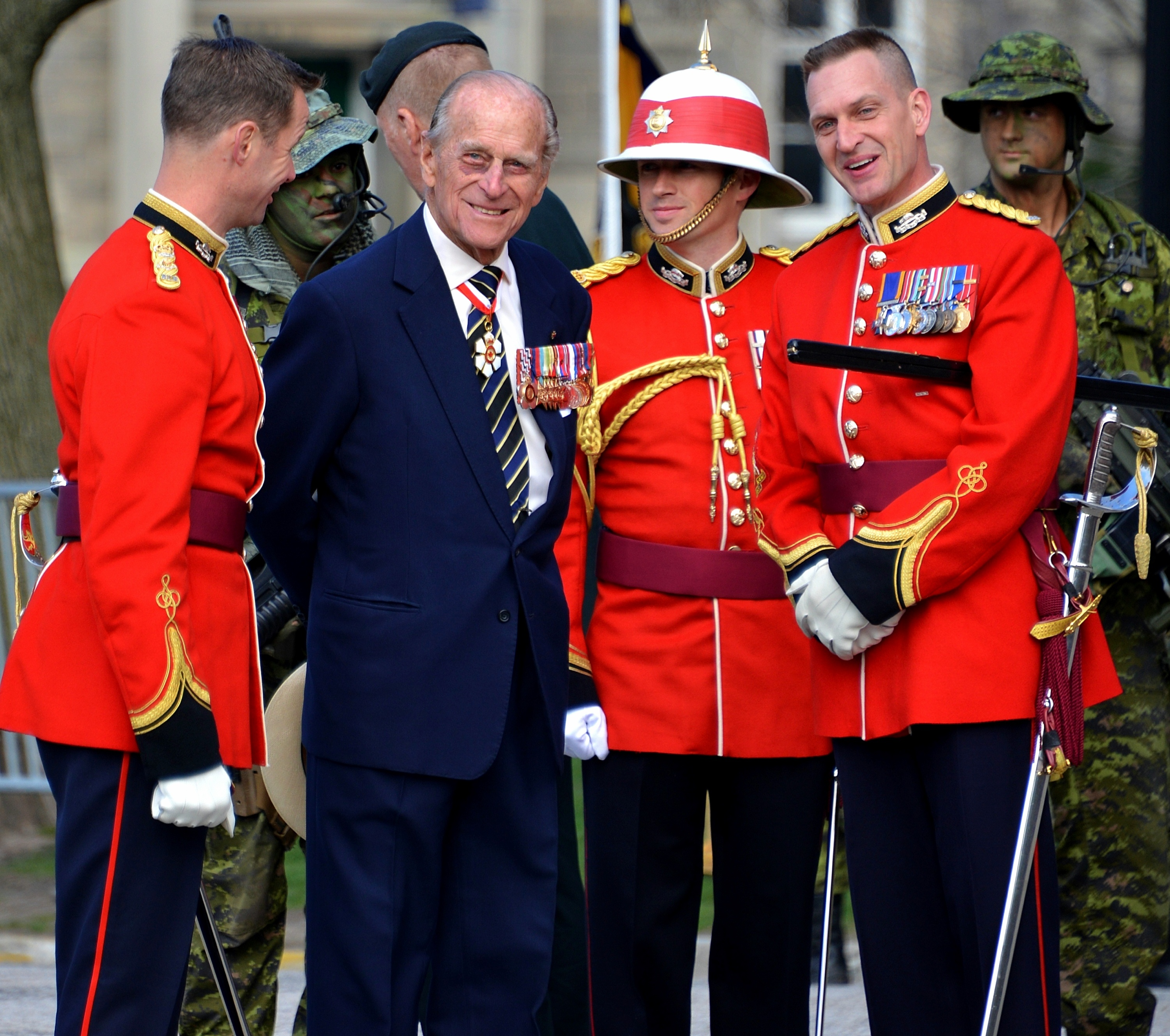
Prince Philip with the Royal Canadian Regiment as their colonel-in-chief. Prince Philip held several ceremonial appointments within the Canadian Armed Forces.

In 2011, to mark his 90th birthday, Prince Philip, Duke of Edinburgh, was appointed to the top ranks in all three branches of the Canadian Forces—General of the Land Force Command (later Canadian Army), General of the Air Command (later Royal Canadian Air Force), and Admiral of the Maritime Command (later Royal Canadian Navy)—making him the first to receive such appointments. Though non-royals have been appointed as colonels-in-chief, the practice is rare and the placement of former Governor General Adrienne Clarkson as Colonel-in-Chief of Princess Patricia's Canadian Light Infantry caused some controversy as a break with tradition.

Military-related organizations—institutes, benevolent funds, leagues, associations, messes, etcetera—may also receive royal patronage. As with regiment- and unit-related appointments, those who act as patron will correspond with organisation leaders, participate in ceremonial events, assist with fundraising, and the like. Applications for royal patronage are made via the Office of the Governor General; to receive the honour, an organization must prove to be long lasting and have aims and objectives that will earn the approval of the person from whom patronage is requested.

=== Infrastructure ===
Buildings, installations, and geographical features related to the Canadian Forces or Department of National Defence can only be named for living or deceased members of the Canadian royal family, living or deceased former governors general, and deceased distinguished persons.

All Canadian naval ships are designated with the prefix His Majesty's Canadian Ship (Her Majesty's Canadian Ship in the reign of a queen), or HMCS (NCSM (Navire canadien de Sa Majesté) in French). These vessels must dress—be decorated with signal flags—for specific royal occasions, including Accession Day (8 September), the actual birthday of the monarch (presently 14 November), the official birthday of the monarch (Monday before 25 May), and the birthday of the royal consort (10 June).

=== Orders, decorations, and medals ===
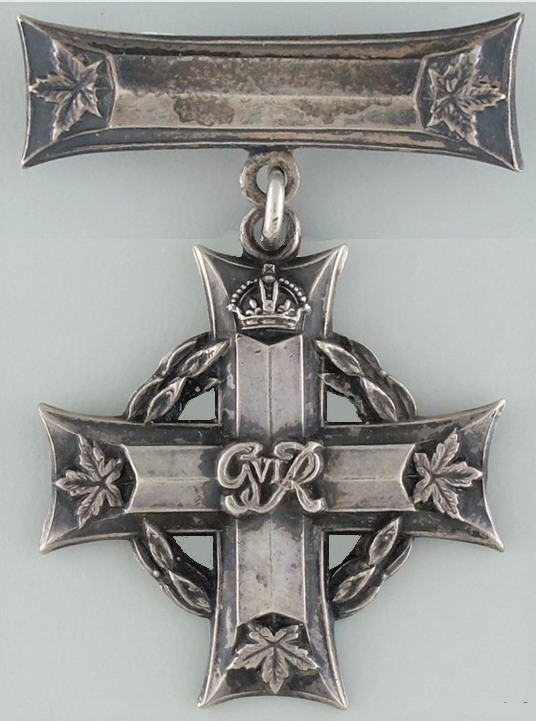
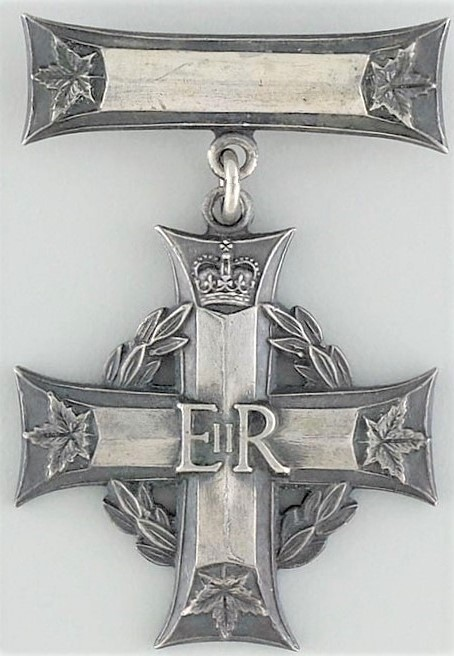
The Memorial Cross during the reigns of King George VI (left) and Queen Elizabeth II (right) with their royal cyphers at the centres and, at the apexes, the Tudor Crown and St. Edward's Crown, respectively

The King is the fount of honour, from which come orders, medals, and decorations available to members of the Canadian Armed Forces; these are: the Victoria Cross (named for its founder, Queen Victoria), the Order of Military Merit; Star of Military Valour, and Medal of Military Valour; the military divisions of the Meritorious Service Cross and Meritorious Service Medal; and the war and operational service medals. The King's effigy, St. Edward's Crown, or the Canadian Royal Crown thus appear on the insignia of orders or on medals.

Further, injury or death in action is recognised by the Sacrifice Medal and Memorial Cross (also known as the Silver Cross for Mothers), while acts of bravery or diligence on the battlefield are recognised by field commander reports to the sovereign, known as Mentioned in Despatches.

== History ==
=== Colonies and Confederation ===
As European colonization of the Americas took place, the European explorers regarded some newly contacted indigenous chieftainships as a form of monarchy, wherein warriors were under the command of a hereditary chief. However, though they may have been the holders of power, all chiefs were not necessarily free to mobilise troops without the consent of a council of elders, similar to the situation in a modern constitutional monarchy; for example, in the Cherokee nation, the approval of the council of women was required before war could be declared.

During this period, at the end of the 18th into the beginning of the 19th centuries, the local militia were called upon to augment the British sovereign's forces in defending the colonies against attacks—such as those in 1775 and 1812—from the United States, which viewed the nearby monarchical presence as a threat to American republican ideologies.

As the colonial population increased, those loyal to the Crown served as regular members of local militia groups under the command of the relevant governor, who exercised the authority of either the French or British monarch. These groups would fight alongside First Nations who had offered their allegiance to the king back in Europe, often in order to wage war on their own enemy tribes who had allied themselves with the other sovereign. Once King Louis XV surrendered his Canadian territories, members of the British royal family began to serve in military postings in the colonies; from 1786 to 1887, Prince William Henry (later King William IV) ventured to Canada's east coast as captain of HMS Pegasus in a Royal Navy contingent and his younger brother,

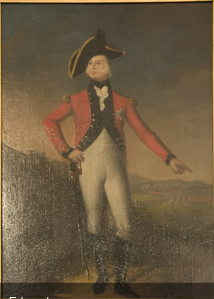
Prince Edward with the Star of the Garter, voted to him by the Nova Scotia House of Assembly in 1798. He served as the Commander-in-Chief of the Maritimes during the 1790s.

Prince Edward, Duke of Kent, was posted with the British Army to the Canadas, and later Halifax, where he acted as Commander-in-Chief of the Maritimes between 1791 and 1798 and again from 1799 to 1800. During his time in Nova Scotia, he presided over the expansion of Halifax, and improved the city's defences

Following the formation of the Canadian federation in 1867, a proper military was established for the new country. This group was joined three years later by Prince Arthur, who became the first royal to fight for Canada, against the Fenians who attempted to invade the country. For his service, the Prince was awarded the Canada General Service Medal with the Fenian Raid 1870 bar. By 1874, the Royal Military College of Canada was established, with Queen Victoria's consent for the use of the royal prefix granted in 1878. Her grandson, King George V, gave the same permission for the Royal Canadian Navy when it was created in 1911, as did his son, King Edward VIII, for the Royal Canadian Air Force six years after it was established in 1918. It was in the new Canadian navy that a young Prince Albert (later King George VI) served as a midshipman for the duration of 1913.

=== World Wars and between ===
Canada came to be at war when in 1914 King George V declared that the British Empire was at war with its German counterpart. At the time, Canada had in Ottawa a royal viceroy in the form of Prince Arthur, Duke of Connaught and Strathearn; though well intended, the Prince donned his Field Marshal's uniform and, without ministerial advice, went to military training grounds and barracks to address the troops and see them off on their voyage to Europe. This was much to the chagrin of the prime minister at the time, Robert Borden, who saw the Governor General as overstepping constitutional conventions. Though Borden blamed the military secretary of the day, Edward Stanton, he also opined that Prince Arthur "laboured under the handicap of his position as a member of the Royal Family and never realised his limitations as Governor General." Arthur's wife, Princess Louise Margaret, Duchess of Connaught, also helped in the war effort, forming volunteer groups to make supplies for Canadian soldiers overseas; for Christmas in 1915, she sent a card and a box of maple sugar to every Canadian serving in Europe and she had a knitting machine installed at Rideau Hall, on which she made thousands of pairs of socks for soldiers. Princess Patricia, the Connaughts' daughter, became so active with the military that Princess Patricia's Canadian Light Infantry was in 1914 named in her honour; the Princess personally chose the infantry's colours, designed its badge, and was appointed as its colonel-in-chief at the cessation of hostilities in 1918.

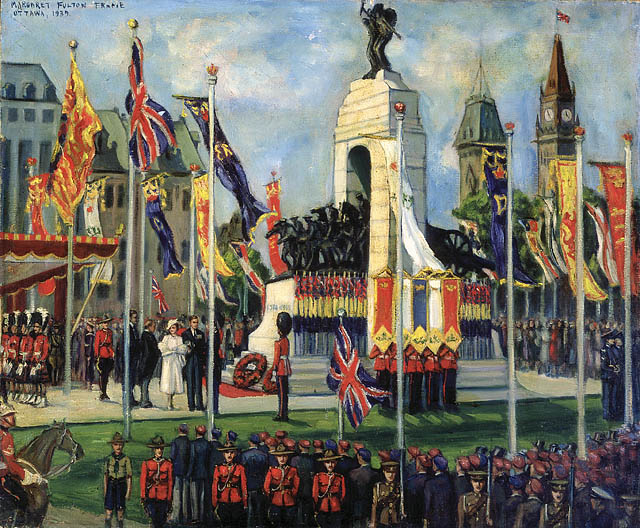
King George VI dedicates the National War Memorial in Ottawa, 1939, by Margaret Fulton Frame

Across the Atlantic, Prince Edward (later King Edward VIII) was serving on the Western Front with the Canadian Corps, his participation in the fighting establishing a popularity among veterans during the Prince's latter tours of Canada as Prince of Wales. By 1936, Edward, as king, had taken up ceremonial military tasks and became the first Canadian sovereign to do so solely on behalf of Canada when he dedicated the Canadian National Vimy Memorial in France. Following Edward's abdication that same year, his brother acceded to the throne as George VI; for his coronation in the summer of 1937, the Canadian Coronation Contingent was formed and sent to London. Two years later, the King presided over a number of military ceremonies in Canada, including dedicating the National War Memorial in Ottawa and presenting colours to regiments. By the end of that summer, however, the King had declared war on Nazi Germany; unlike his father, George did this uniquely as king of Canada—on the advice of the Canadian Cabinet with the approval of the Parliament of Canada—a week after he had done so as King of the United Kingdom.

In the United Kingdom, the Royal Family was active in relation to Canada's troops; Queen Elizabeth, for instance, inspected the 1st Battalion of the Saskatoon Light Infantry in April 1940 and, the following year, presented the unit with gifts of socks, mittens, caps, pullovers, scarves, and helmets, as well as the unit's Colours in October. Her daughter, Princess Elizabeth (later Queen Elizabeth II), also undertook solo duties, such as reviewing a parade of Canadian airwomen in 1945 and interacting with the Canadian regiments to which she had been appointed colonel-in-chief. Other members of the Royal Family performed military duties in Canada during the war: Prince George, Duke of Kent, did so in Manitoba in 1941 and the King's first cousin once removed, Princess Alice, who was then serving as the Canadian viceregal consort to the Governor General, was installed as honorary commandant of a number of women's military services.

=== New queen and Canadian Forces unification ===
In a time of austerity following the Second World War, the Coronation Contingent was again mounted to participate in the 1953 coronation of Canada's new sovereign, Queen Elizabeth II. Not only did the forces now have a new Commander-in-Chief, but the post-war period saw major shifts in the structure of the Royal Canadian Navy, Canadian Army, and Royal Canadian Air Force. By 1968, the unification of all three elements into the unified Canadian Forces took effect at the recommendation of then Defence Minister Paul Hellyer, over the protests of many senior generals, admirals, and air marshals.

While the National Defence Act continued to state that "[t]he Canadian Forces are the armed forces of Her Majesty raised by Canada," the royal prefix was not bestowed upon the unified Canadian Armed Forces. The uses of Royal Canadian Navy, Canadian Army, and Royal Canadian Air Force were also replaced with Maritime Command, Mobile Command, and Air Force Command, respectively, and a number of royally designated corps were lost into newly reorganized and designated services and branches. (Note: For example, the Royal Canadian Army Medical Corps and the Royal Canadian Dental Corps became the Canadian Forces Medical Service and Canadian Forces Dental Services and the Royal Canadian Ordnance Corps amalgamated with the supply and transport services of the Royal Canadian Army Service Corps to become the Logistics Branch.) Not all the forces' links with the Crown, however, were lost; many of the regiments did retain their royal prefix, members of the Royal Family as their colonel-in-chief, and crowns on their badges and other insignia.

As the Canadian Forces came to be deployed mostly on United Nations peacekeeping operations following the Korean War, the role of the royals and viceroys to turned more towards observation and interaction, rather than morale boosting. The Queen, her mother, sister, children, and cousins, as well as governors general, visited with forces personnel either in Canada or abroad, undertook various duties on behalf of the organization, and dedicated armed conflict and military memorials. During this period, Prince Charles, like other Princes of Wales before him, trained with the Canadian Forces at CFB Gagetown in the 1970s and his father's cousin, the Countess Mountbatten of Burma, as Colonel-in-Chief of Princess Patricia's Canadian Light Infantry, visited with her troops on more than 45 occasions, at Canadian Forces bases and detachments across the country as well as overseas in Cyprus, Croatia, Bosnia and Herzegovina, and Kosovo. Later, in 1996, Queen Elizabeth II inaugurated the Canadian War Memorial in Green Park, London, just outside Buckingham Palace.

=== Beyond the era of peacekeeping ===
With Canada's participation in the invasion of Afghanistan and the casualties of that conflict, the Canadian Forces came more into the public eye than it had been through the previous two decades. Governor General Adrienne Clarkson won wide praise for boosting Canadians' pride in the armed forces, spending Christmasses and New Years with forces personnel in Afghanistan and the Persian Gulf and earning herself a special tribute from the Canadian Forces upon her retirement from the Queen's service in 2005. Members of the Royal Family continued their duties as honoraries, visiting troops in Canada and Afghanistan, (Note: In early March 2010, the Princess Royal visited with Canadian troops at Camp Bastion in Afghanistan, as Prince Andrew, Duke of York, had done in 2008, when he presented Colours to and lunched with the Royal Highland Fusiliers in Lashkar Gah. The Prince of Wales then met with Canadian troops, amongst others from the Commonwealth, in Afghanistan on 24 March 2010.) as well as attending memorials.

Also in 2004 was the 60th anniversary of D-Day, which was commemorated at Juno Beach in the presence of the Queen, Clarkson, and Prince Charles. The Queen then in 2007 attended the 90th anniversary of the Battle of Passchendaele in Belgium and, in April of that year, re-dedicated the Canadian Vimy Memorial on the 90th anniversary of the battle it commemorates, following in the footsteps of her uncle, King Edward VIII. She was there accompanied by her husband, Prince Philip, Duke of Edinburgh, who was dressed in the uniform of the Royal Canadian Regiment, which both fought at Vimy Ridge and had just the day previous lost six members during combat operations in Afghanistan. It was reported in June of the same year that Prince Harry, then third in line to the Canadian throne, had arrived in Alberta to train along with other soldiers of the Canadian and British armies at CFB Suffield, before a tour of duty in Afghanistan.

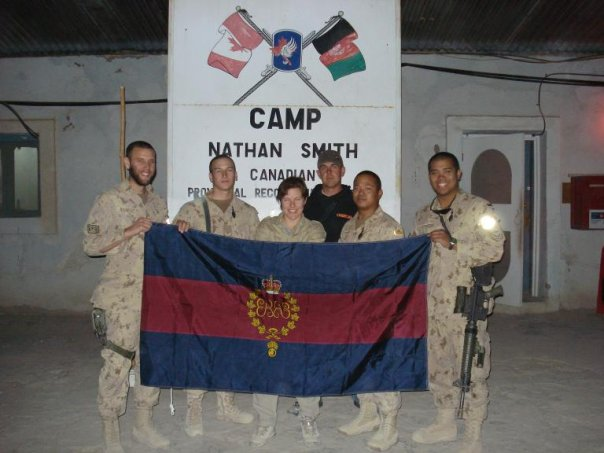
Members of the Canadian Grenadier Guards pose at Camp Nathan Smith, Afghanistan, with the regiment's flag, which bears the double mirrored royal cypher of Queen Elizabeth II, ER, beneath St. Edward's Crown all within a wreath of maple leaves; 3 February 2008

On 4 November 2008, the Queen launched at Canada House in London Vigil 1914–1918, a coordinated light and media display on the facades of Canada House and buildings in six Canadian cities of the name of each of the approximately 68,000 Canadians who died in World War I; there the Queen and the Duke of Edinburgh met with First World War veterans as well as Canadians returned from Afghanistan. Almost one year later, Prince Charles officiated at the Remembrance Day ceremonies at the National War Memorial in Ottawa, there wearing his uniform as a Lieutenant-General of the Canadian Army.

The death of the last Canadian veteran of World War I came in 2010 and, on the anniversary of the Battle of Vimy Ridge in April that year, Queen Elizabeth II issued a statement marking the two events, stating: "As proud and grateful Canadians, we pause today to mark not only the ninety-third anniversary of this Nation's victory at Vimy Ridge but also to pay tribute to the passing of a truly remarkable generation who helped to end the most terrible conflict the world had ever known." A few months later, on 29 June, the Queen marked the 100th anniversary of the founding of the Royal Canadian Navy by conducting a fleet review at the Bedford Basin; the event was attended by ships of the Canadian Maritime Command, Brazilian Navy, Royal Danish Navy, French Navy, German Navy, Royal Netherlands Navy, Royal Navy and United States Navy.

The three environmental commands were in 2011 officially renamed to their traditional designations of the Royal Canadian Navy, Canadian Army, and Royal Canadian Air Force. This stemmed from an ongoing drive for the restoration, including an online petition, sponsored by Member of Parliament Laurie Hawn, issued in 2007 seeking grassroots support for the Maritime Command and Air Command to have their former names restored for the navy's 100th anniversary in 2010.

== See also ==
- Monarchy of Canada
- Commander-in-Chief of the Canadian Forces
