= Declaration of war by Canada =

A declaration of war by Canada is issued by the Government of Canada (the federal Crown-in-Council). It is an exercise of the royal prerogative on the constitutional advice of the ministers of the Crown in Cabinet and does not require the direct approval of the Parliament of Canada, though such can be sought by the government. Since gaining the authority to declare war as a consequence of the Statute of Westminster, 1931, Canada has done so only during the Second World War.

== Second World War ==
=== Nazi Germany ===
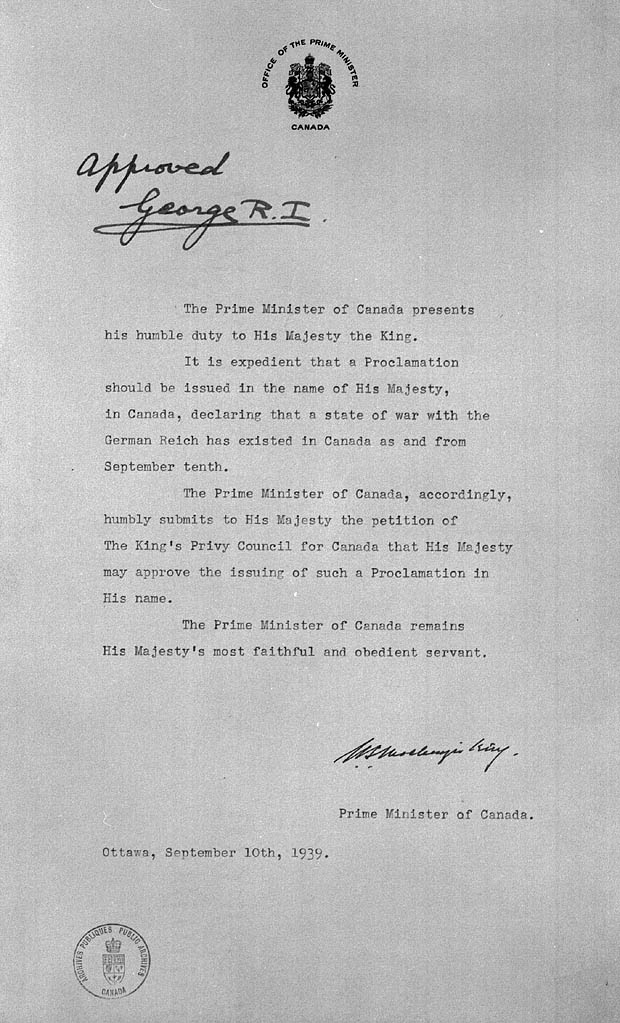
Prime Minister Mackenzie King's request to King George VI for approval that war be declared against Germany, 10 September 1939

After Nazi Germany invaded Poland on September 1, 1939, the United Kingdom and France declared war on September 3. To assert Canada's independence from the UK, as already established by the Statute of Westminster, 1931, the Cabinet decided to seek the approval of the federal Parliament to declare war. Parliament was not scheduled to return until October 2, but was summoned by the Governor General early on September 7 to consider the declaration of war.

The House of Commons and Senate approved authorization for a declaration of war on 9 September. The Cabinet then drafted an order-in-council to that effect. The following day, Vincent Massey, Canada's High Commissioner to the United Kingdom, brought the document to George VI, King of Canada, at the Royal Lodge, Windsor Great Park, for his signature, whereupon Canada had officially declared war on Germany. In his capacity as the government's official recorder for the war effort, Leonard Brockington noted: "King George VI of England did not ask us to declare war for him—we asked King George VI of Canada to declare war for us."

=== Fascist Italy ===
On June 10, 1940, Italy declared war on France and the United Kingdom and its allies. Though the Canadian Minister of National Defence, Norman Rogers, had been killed in a plane crash that day, Prime Minister Mackenzie King still tabled a motion in the House of Commons, stating in it:

Whereas Italy has declared her intention to enter the war on the side of Germany and against the allied powers; and

Whereas a state of war now exists between the United Kingdom and France on the one hand and Italy, on the other; and

Whereas at the outbreak of war the Parliament of Canada decided to stand at the side of the United Kingdom and France in their determined effort to resist aggression and to preserve freedom;

It is expedient that the houses of Parliament do approve the entry of Canada into a state of war with Italy and that this house does approve the same.

Mackenzie King went on to explain that, after passage of the motion through Parliament, it would be presented, via Cabinet, to the King for his approval and a royal proclamation would be produced, declaring "the existence of a state of war between Canada and Italy." Both houses of Parliament gave their consent to a declaration of war and the Cabinet proceeded with the aforementioned steps the same day. The proclamation, as printed in the Canada Gazette, was read by the Prime Minister to Parliament on June 11 1940.

=== Japan, Finland, Hungary, and Romania ===
Parliament adjourned on November 14, 1941, and was not scheduled to return until January 21, 1942. However, at the urging of the Soviet Union, the United Kingdom declared war on Finland on December 6, 1941. At the UK's urging, the Canadian Cabinet the next day issued a royal proclamation declaring war on Finland, Hungary, and Romania, three countries that had recently allied themselves with Nazi Germany.

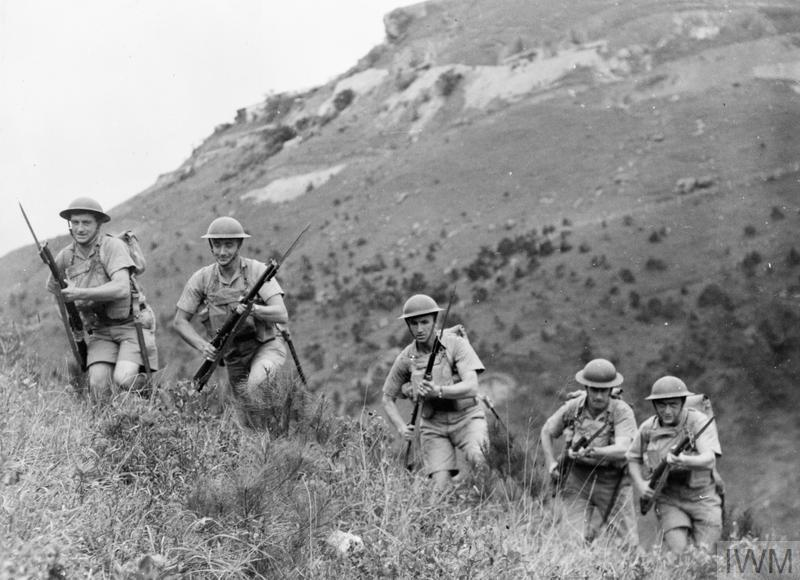
Canadian soldiers train in the hills of Hong Kong ahead of the Japanese invasion, 1941

Coincidentally, also on December 7, 1941 (December 8 in Japan), the Empire of Japan invaded Hong Kong and Malaya and attacked Pearl Harbor, followed by a declaration of war upon the United Kingdom, Canada, and the United States. Mackenzie King and the rest of Cabinet decided to go to war with Japan that evening and had the Governor General issue a royal proclamation the following day asserting that, as of December 7, a state of war existed between Japan and Canada. The same day, the US and UK also declared war on the Japanese Empire.

These proclamations were presented by Mackenzie King to the House of Commons when parliament returned on its scheduled date. Therein, the Prime Minister tabled motions for parliamentary approval of the declarations of war, although permission from the legislators was not legally required. According to his diary, Mackenzie King told himself the latest declarations of war were "all part of the same war", meaning the war that had begun for Canada on September 10, 1939. The Prime Minister had thus decided there was no need for Parliament to be reconvened earlier than scheduled. Still, Parliament having not been sitting when war was declared on Japan, Romania, Finland, and Hungary was concerning to Mackenzie King.

In the late evening of December 7, 1941, the Canadian Prime Minister, W. L. Mackenzie King, announced the Cabinet's decision to declare war on Japan. The King approved Canada's declaration of war in the following proclamation issued on December 8, 1941.

Whereas by and with the advice of our Privy Council for Canada we have signified our approval of the issue of a proclamation in the Canada Gazette declaring that a state of war with Japan exists and has existed in Canada as and from the 7th day of December, 1941.

Now, therefore, we do hereby declare and proclaim that a state of war with Japan exists and has existed as and from the seventh day of December, 1941.

Of all which our loving subjects and all others whom these presents may concern are hereby required to take notice and to govern themselves accordingly. (https://ibiblio.org/pha/policy/1941/411208b.html)

== Since the Second World War ==
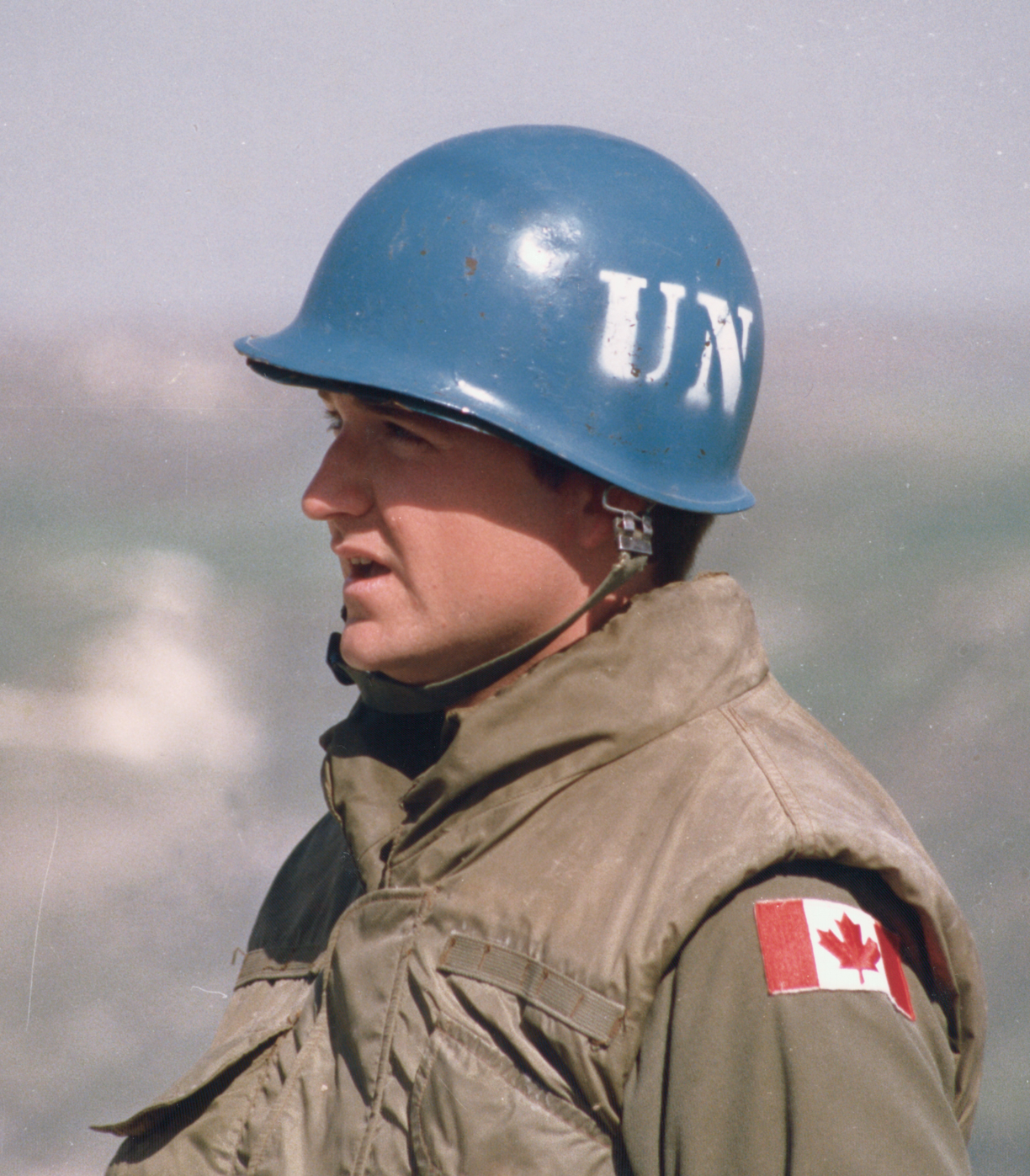
A member of the Canadian Armed Forces deployed on a United Nations mission

While Canada has participated in a number of conflicts since the Second World War, the country has not declared war in any of them. Even before that war officially ended for Canada by royal proclamation in 1951, Canada entered the Korean War on August 15, 1950, after the United Nations Security Council passed a resolution requesting assistance from member-states of the United Nations in dealing with North Korean aggression. Cabinet, then headed by Prime Minister Louis St Laurent, stated to the House of Commons that Canada would not declare war on North Korea, but would send military forces to participate in a collective police action, "under the control of the United Nations for the purpose of restoring peace to an area where an aggression has occurred", in keeping with the Charter of the United Nations, which Canada signed in 1945. While that charter does not prevent one country from declaring war on another, it sets up a collective wherein members of the United Nations can join together to thwart aggression by a country and "restore peace without having to go through the formality of declaring war".

Canada has since repeatedly supported the UN and cooperative action in ensuring international peace. As such. the National Defence Act was amended in 1950, by the Canadian Forces Act, to allow for the Crown-in-Council to put the Canadian Armed Forces into active service both when the country's security is threatened and when the country engages in collective action under the UN Charter, the North Atlantic Treaty, or other international defence arrangements. The act also requires the governor general to recall parliament within 10 days of the government putting the military into active service.

After the Canadian Forces Act received royal assent on September 9, 1950, the Governor General-in-Council issued Order-in-Council PC 1950-4365, assigning a number of Canadian Armed Forces members to the Korean War and placing all Canadian military personnel on active service. As a result of that order, and subsequent amendments, the Canadian Armed Forces have effectively been on active duty since 1950.

== See also ==
- Monarchy of Canada and the Canadian Armed Forces
- Military history of Canada
- Military history of Canada during World War II
- Declarations of war by Great Britain and the United Kingdom
- Declaration of war by the United States
