= Monarchism in Canada =

Canadian monarchism is a movement for raising awareness of Canada's constitutional monarchy among the Canadian public, and advocating for its retention, countering republican and anti-monarchical reform as being generally revisionist, idealistic, and ultimately impracticable. Generally, Canadian monarchism runs counter to anti-monarchist republicanism, but not necessarily to the classical form of republicanism itself, as most monarchists in Canada support the constitutional variety of monarchy, sometimes referred to as a crowned republic. These beliefs can be expressed either individually—generally in academic circles—or through what are known as loyal societies, which include the Monarchist League of Canada, legions, historical groups, ethnic organizations, and sometimes police and scout bodies. Though there may be overlap, this concept should not be confused with royalism, the support of a particular monarch or dynasty; Canadian monarchists may appreciate the monarchy without thinking highly of the monarch. There have also been, from time to time, suggestions in favour of a uniquely Canadian monarch, either one headed by a descendant of the present monarch and resident in Canada or one based on a First Nations royal house.

In Canada, monarchism, though it is sometimes mocked by its opponents, is driven by various factors: monarchists support the perceived practicality of popular power being ultimately placed in the hands of a non-partisan, apolitical individual, and see the Canadian monarchy as a modern link, via the Crown's shared nature, to ethnically and historically similar countries around the world. It is also celebrated by monarchists as being a significant element of Canada's national identity, stemming from the organization's 500-year deep roots in the country's tradition, as well as having a pivotal role in maintaining Canada's independence from the United States. David E. Smith asserted in 2017 that the Canadian Crown is not only the "keystone of the constitutional architecture of Canada", but also "an index both of the history of Canadian development as a federation and as an autonomous member of the Commonwealth."

Though polling has traditionally suggested little interest in removing the monarchy during the reign of Elizabeth II, more recent polls conducted in 2022 and 2023 following the accession of Charles III suggested that a majority of Canadians think there should be a referendum on the future of the monarchy and that more Canadians now favour becoming a republic than do retaining the monarchy, although a most recent poll in Canada suggested that the majority of Canadians do prefer remaining a monarchy.

== National identity ==
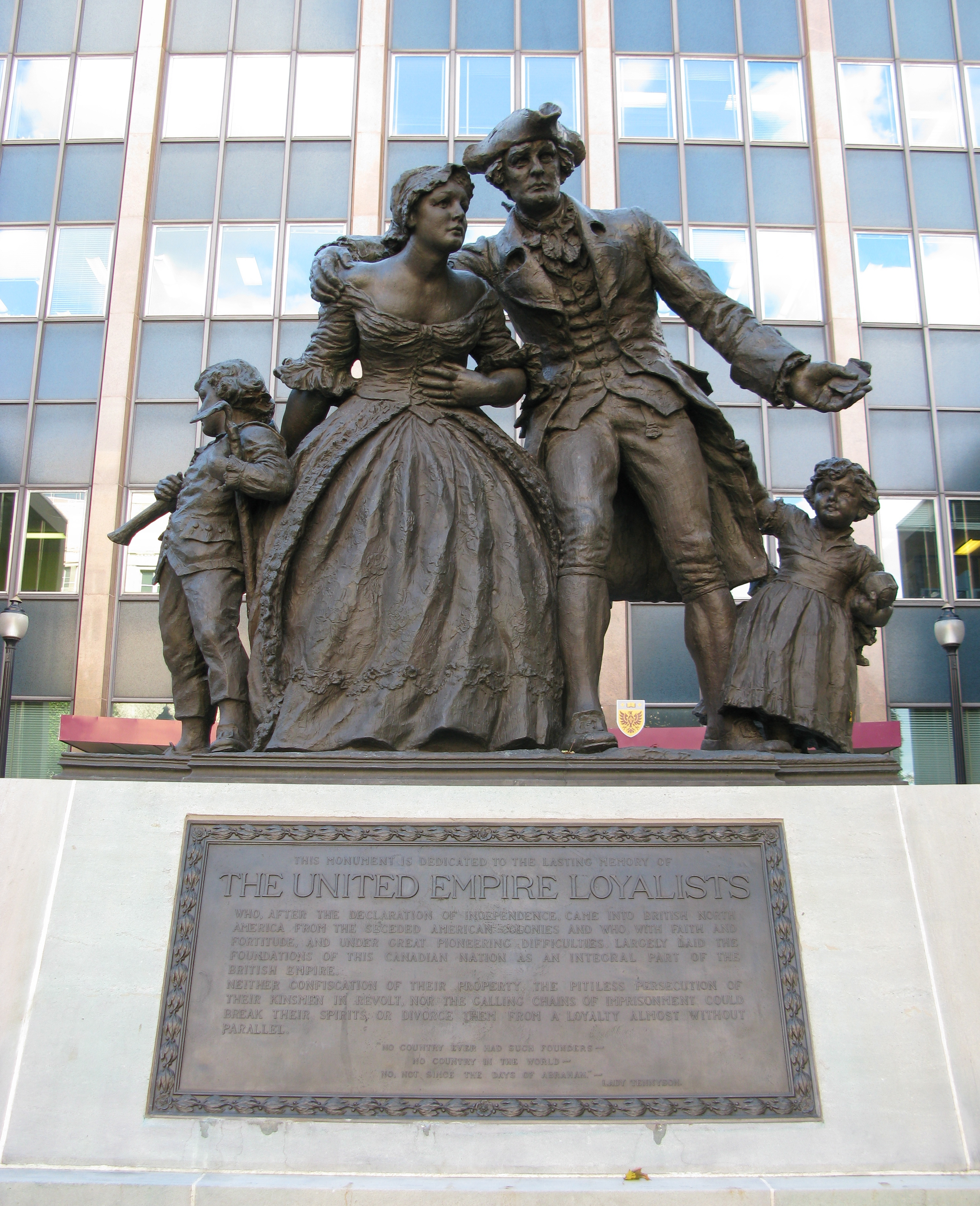
A monument to the United Empire Loyalists in Hamilton, Ontario.

Every country is different, and we grew up in this one with the Royal Family as part of our heritage.

— Wayne Gretzky, General Motors Place, Vancouver, 2002

=== Legal and cultural sovereignty ===
==== Colonial era ====
From Canada's colonial period until the end of the Second World War, monarchism was prevalent among the region's inhabitants. Even after the transfer of New France to the British in 1763, a faction of the French-speaking population was loyal to the British Crown and its institutions of government, while the Catholic Church in Quebec fostered monarchism in a different form by urging its parishioners to appreciate the absolutist monarchy system that existed in France. The majority could be lured to neither the republicanism that boiled south of the border, nor to the revolution and regicide that took place in France in 1789 and 1793 respectively.

At the same time, those who remained loyal to the British monarchy and its empire during the American Revolutionary War faced repercussions then and after the conflict. By seeking refuge in the Canadas and settling much of what is now Ontario and the Maritimes, they, who came to be known as the United Empire Loyalists, brought with them their support for the Crown and gave root to the idea that the monarchy stood for "beliefs and institutions ... considered essential in the preservation of a form of life different from, and superior to, the manners, politics, and social arrangements of the United States." Republicans were seen as being generally of American origin, having thus been taught to admire republican government as the best in the world and to ridicule monarchism, "a few individuals, who unfortunately, are led by those, whose hostility to the British constitution is such, that they would sacrifice any and every thing to pull it down, in order that they might build up a Republic on its ruins."

Predominantly, Canadians retained their loyalty to Britain's constitutional monarchy, a feeling that was only intensified by the American invasions of the Canadas in 1812. Further, the republican rebellions of 1837—with their significant minority of conservative followers who critiqued Canada's Westminster parliamentary constitutional monarchy as both too democratic and too tyrannical in comparison to their preferred American model of checks and balances—failed to inspire the majority of colonists to espouse a break with the Crown. The Orange Order played a role in maintaining this allegiance, as, after expressed fears that the order's establishment in Upper Canada would cause conflict between Protestants and Roman Catholics, in 1830 the Grand Orange Lodge of British America's first Grand Master, Ogle Robert Gowan, moved to diminish the organization's religious exclusivity and instead have the order exist partly to foster appreciation of the King and constitution.

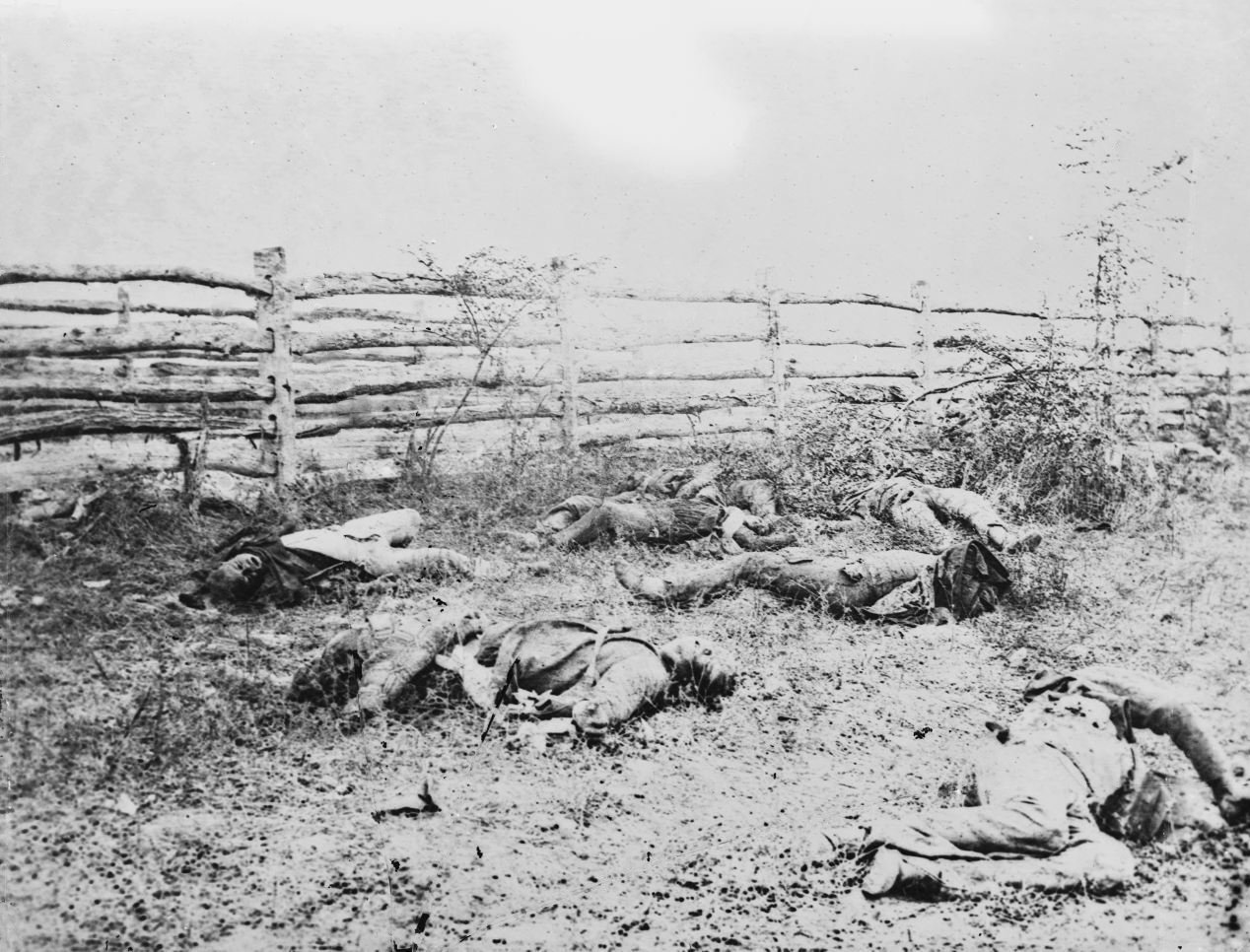
Casualties of the American Civil War in September 1862; the Canadian Fathers of Confederation blamed the conflict on weaknesses in the American republican system

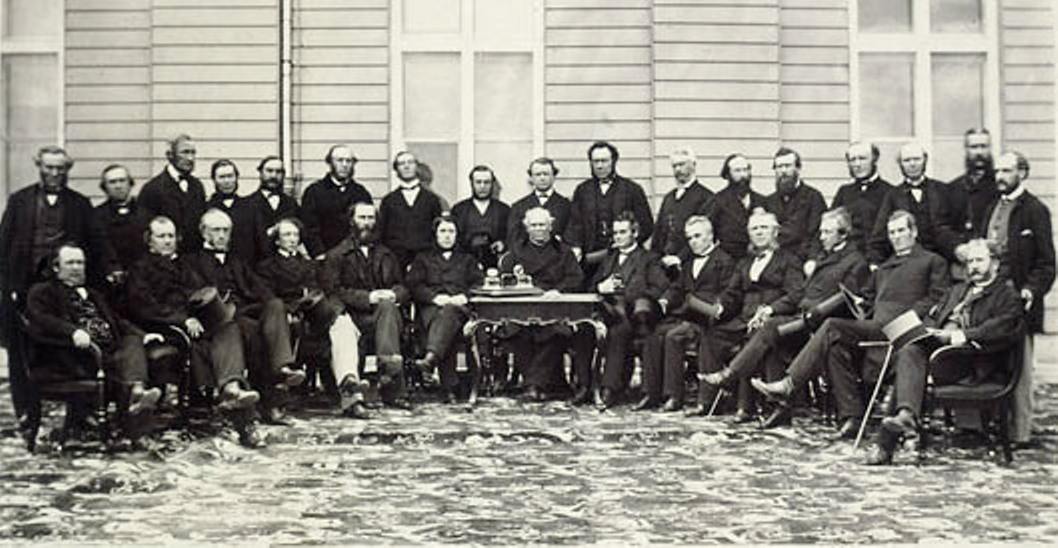
Many of the monarchist Fathers of Confederation at the Quebec Conference, October 1864

==== A confederated Dominion ====
Monarchist feelings were further entrenched in many English Canadians' minds following the American Civil War, which was seen by them as "the final stage in the discredit of [American] democracy and republicanism." Thus, by the time of Canada's formation in 1867, constitutional monarchy was, after their analysis of the American republic, unanimously selected by the Fathers of Confederation – led by the monarchist John A. Macdonald, and including delegates from Quebec – and approved of by the three elected legislatures of Canada, Nova Scotia, and New Brunswick. It was noted in the early 1960s by William Lewis Morton, in his attempt to clarify both the historic and continuing significance of the Canadian monarchy, that the structuring of Canada as a kingdom was not "bait for dim-witted Tory voters", but was instead a way for Canada to assert its presence in North America and thwart American expansionism into Canadian territories; the constitutional monarchy was meant as a balance between the autocracy of the Russian Empire and the popular sovereignty of the United States that had just led to the Civil War. Instead of the constitution being based on a promise between the state and the people, it was created around a form of allegiance, wherein, as Morton put it, "there was no pressure for uniformity ... Monarchy made it possible to achieve all these things, whereas republican democracy would, it seemed, have ensured the victory of local interests and race antagonisms in British North America, a victory ending in absorption into the United States. Still, republican ideals – by their wider definition – did have influence during the setting period of after Confederation, wherein the use of laws and the institutions formed by them was moulded by popular attitudes coexistent with monarchical preference. For instance, against the intentions of those who framed the constitution, the provinces began to regard themselves as homogeneous communities, each with a right to a certain amount of self-governance founded on a co-sovereign crown, a notion that was eventually cemented in by the 1882 Judicial Committee of the Privy Council case of Maritime Bank vs. Receiver-General of New Brunswick.

==== Post-Quebec sovereignty movement ====
The "almost cult status" the monarchy enjoyed in the first half of the 20th century began to waver between the 1950s and 1970s, as the British Empire evolved into the Commonwealth of Nations and a new Canadian identity emerged, multiculturalism was established as an official policy in Canada, and Quebec separatism began to blossom; the latter becoming the major impetus of political controversy around the Crown. Prime Ministers Louis St. Laurent and Lester B. Pearson both saw the Crown as a Canadian icon making the country distinct from the US; indeed, Queen Elizabeth II's royal tour of 1959 was said by the Financial Post to be a demonstration that Canada was "not just the fifty first state of the Union," and even amongst the various letters sent to newspapers denouncing the lack of fully Canadian symbols available for use, few called for abolition of the monarchy, most Canadians seeing a need for their country to have a form of government different from that of the United States.

At the same time, and into the period of Pierre Trudeau's prime ministership, however, some of the royal symbols that had previously been accepted as representative of Canada because of their British heritage became the target of iconoclasm for exactly the same reason, (Note: For example, the Queen's portrait disappeared from public buildings, and the Royal Canadian Navy and Royal Canadian Air Force were merged into the unified Canadian Forces.) and the Crown was more frequently said to be at odds with multiculturalism; Canadians were, according to Arthur Bousfield and Gary Toffoli, being encouraged to "neglect, ignore, forget, reject, debase, suppress, even hate and certainly treat as foreign what their parents and grandparents, whether spiritual or blood, regarded as the basis of Canadian nationhood, autonomy and history", including the monarchy. This phenomenon was the inspiration for the founding in 1970 of the Monarchist League of Canada (MLC) as an organised way for citizens to voice their opposition to any downplaying of the Crown.

Still, at the height of the Quiet Revolution, in 1967, Vincent Massey opined that "the Monarchy is so essential to us that without it as a bastion of Canadian nationality, of Canadian purpose and of Canadian independence, we could not remain a Sovereign State", and three years later, Roland Michener said of the Canadian Crown and identity: "[The Monarchy] is our own by inheritance and choice, and contributes much to our distinctive Canadian identity and our chances of independent survival amongst the republics of North and South America", which was echoed by John Diefenbaker, who questioned: "well, having a royal family means we're not American. And isn't that enough?" In polls from the 1970s onwards, majorities continued to believe the Crown was a Canadian foil against the cultural intrusions of the United States, leading monarchists, for their part, to maintain the notion that the Crown keeps Canada culturally and legally sovereign from its largest republican neighbour, even claiming in the early 21st century to have seen a rise in support for the monarchy amongst Canadian youth for just such a reason. Those like the University of Lethbridge's Professor of Native American Studies Tony Hall, George Grant, and Eugene Forsey, theorised that the greatest threat to the Canadian Crown was not its British origins, but instead the "expansionist powers of Manifest Destiny in the United States and those who wished to move Canada closer to the American sphere and its presidential style marketplace politics", where corporate personalities amongst the sovereign populace could wield significantly more power over government than in the monarchical system where sovereignty is above popular control.

=== Constitutional and societal keystone ===
==== Personification of Canada ====
In a government like ours, the Crown is the abiding and unshakable element in government; politicians may come and go, but the Crown remains and certain aspects of our system pertain to it which are not dependent on any political party. In this sense, the Crown is the consecrated spirit of Canada.

— Robertson Davies, introduction to
Hunting Stuart & the Voice of the People, 1994

I want the Crown to be seen as a symbol of national sovereignty belonging to all. It is not only a link between Commonwealth nations, but between Canadian citizens of every national origin and ancestry ... I want the Crown in Canada to represent everything that is best and most admired in the Canadian ideal.

— Elizabeth II, Toronto, 1973

Canadian monarchists support the official government position (both federal and provincial) of the monarch as the personification of the Canadian state. (Note: See Note 8 at Monarchy of Canada.) They consider a globally travelling, super-celebrity monarch to be apt for a post-modern, multicultural nation like Canada, and see the sovereign as a more personal, less bureaucratic, symbol of the will and character of the "Canadian national family", giving a human face on the nation and locus of allegiance, as opposed to republics where the objective constitution, flag, or "the country" is revered instead. It is the position of the Department of Canadian Heritage and the Canadian Secretary to the Queen that "in every respect, [the monarch] represents the humanity of our country and speaks eloquently of the collective spirit that makes us truly Canadian."

Since at least the 1930s, supporters of the Crown have held the opinion that the Canadian monarch is also one of the rare unified elements of Canadian society, focusing both "the historic consciousness of the nation" and various forms of patriotism and national love "[on] the point around which coheres the nation's sense of a continuing personality", and reflecting this back through lifelong public duties and service, an arrangement its supporters contend allows for diversity, as opposed to the American ideology of the state being the majority and demanding allegiance. Former Governor General Vincent Massey articulated that the monarchy "is part of ourselves. It is linked in a very special way with our national life. It stands for qualities and institutions which mean Canada to every one of us and which for all our differences and all our variety have kept Canada Canadian." Gary Toffoli, past chairman of the Toronto branch of the MLC, stated on this concept that "it is one of the great protections of democracy and one of the weaknesses of the republican system that in our system the Queen is the state and the people are not the state", arguing that such a society permits its members, though they be in an inseparable symbiosis with it, to exist apart from the state, to criticise it, and not take responsibility for what the state might have done. This, he asserted, avoids the paradox wherein opposing the state is opposing the people, which would mean one opposes one's self. George-Étienne Cartier predicted that Canada, with its cohabitational French and English-based cultures, could never have an ethnic nationality, but through allegiance to the common symbol of the Crown, it was possible for the country to be a unified political nationality.

==== Canadian institution and symbol ====
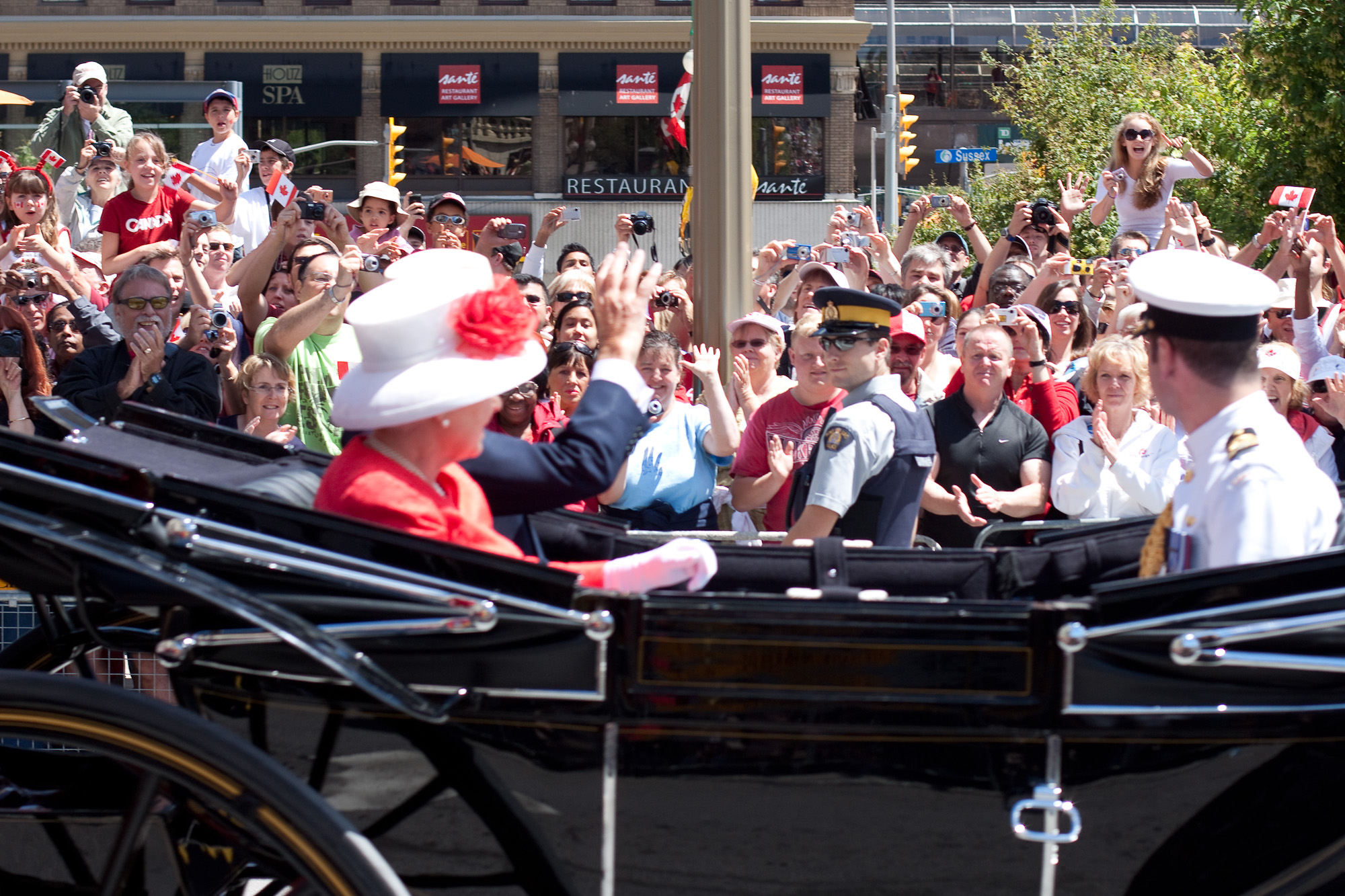
A crowd of Canadians greets Queen Elizabeth II on Canada Day, 2010

Combining constitutional law, the concept of national personification, and their acknowledgement of the reigning monarch as the end of an unbroken chain of sovereigns of Canada that starts with the first European settlement of the region in the 16th century, monarchists in Canada share the Department of Canadian Heritage's view that the sovereign is at least partly, and the monarchy within Canada is fully, Canadian, the monarchy's supporters thus often employing the phrase "Maple Crown", first coined by the Lord Grey in 1905. The contrary opinion of republicans, who continue to brand the persona and institution of the Crown as purely British and foreign intrusions in Canada, is considered by monarchists to be a superficial argument, representative either of ethnic prejudice, or of a cultural and historical confusion that forgets a number of Canadian values – peace, order, and good government; parliamentary democracy; the elevation of public welfare over personal greed; responsible government; etc. – were similarly inherited from the United Kingdom. (Note: Toffoli and Bosefield said in 1996 in Monarchy Canada: "Anyone doing media interviews on the Crown or taking part in radio phone-in shows quickly becomes used to the arguments used by opponents of the Monarchy ... The only one that does any damage because it is a broader, subtler and more plausible notion is the idea that because the Crown is "British" in origin it is somehow foreign and ought to be removed. But if the Queen and the Monarchy are foreign because they are British, so are Parliament, the Common Law and the English language ... (The same argument would of course logically have to be applied to the French language as well. Because it is "French" it would also have to be looked upon as foreign.) Of course we know all these things are not foreign, they are Canadian. They all came to be Canadian in the same way – by being brought here by settlers who became Canadian and by being rooted here and having functioned here for generations. No one can come along and suddenly declare something foreign when it patently is not. If some one does, that person's motives should be looked at closely because they are likely to be grounded in ethnic hatred or prejudice.") Already by the end of the Second World War, a difference had been established amongst Canadians between loyalty to the Crown and loyalty to Britain.

Because of this history and contemporary sentiment, the monarchy's supporters allege that presidential republicanism is not a part of the Canadian psyche, and any move towards such an end, without provocation or real reason, would run contrary to the national persona and be foreign to Canada, as no part of the country had ever been a republic. Indeed, the Quiet Revolution, like earlier revolts, failed to inspire republicanism in the Canadian populace outside of Quebec; (Note: As put by Reg Whitaker: "In the 1960s, in the first fine, careless rapture of bilingualism and biculturalism, an end to the monarchy might have become a shared program between Quebec nationalists and Canadian dualists. It never happened.") amongst that remaining bulk of Canadians, the level of monarchism became difficult to gauge over the ensuing decades, as public opinion polls found instability and sometimes even contradictions in numbers for and against the Canadian monarchy (frequently labelled in questions as "British"), but no popular desire to alter the status quo ever expressed itself. (Note: See note 1 at Republicanism in Canada) After a 1998 Globe and Mail story quoted Peter Donolo, Prime Minister Jean Chrétien's director of communications, saying that the Prime Minister's Office was considering the abolition of the monarchy as a millennium project, Chrétien refuted the claim by saying that the topic of a republic was neither a Liberal priority, nor one for average Canadians, admitting "[t]here's no big debate in Canada." The provincial premiers at the time displayed the same sentiment, (Note: The results revealed one in favour of a republic (Newfoundland and Labrador), one abstaining from comment(Quebec), and the remaining eight in support of Canada's monarchy.) as did various newspaper editorials, with the Ottawa Citizen's headline about the so-called millennium project reading: "Which millennium?" The lack of interest in republicanism cannot, however, be taken automatically as proof of monarchism; Canadians are generally indifferent to the subject, and, as early as the 1950s, it was observed that Canadians don't "think of themselves as citizens of either a republic or a monarchy".

Canadian loyalists further aver that, rather than be ashamed of the country's monarchical chronicle and present arrangements, they should be embraced. Monarchists find that republican arguments often take the form of cultural cringe, focusing, as they perceive it, on long settled issues like Canada's independence and responsible government, or unsubstantiated ones, such as the republican claim that the monarchy was non-consensually imposed on Canadians, and demonstrating a sophistry that has been described as "'presto-you're-an-adult' immaturity that would malign Canada as some sort of pimply-faced adolescent thinking she could prove she is grown up by smoking a cigarette and telling Mom where to get off." Monarchists have contended that this is a product of inadequate knowledge of the monarchy's role in both Canadian history and modern civics, a phenomenon sometimes compounded by the pervasiveness of American culture in Canada.

The central role of the monarchy in the Canadian constitution, and the difficult prescriptions to removing it, are said by monarchists to illustrate the importance of the Crown as the centre of the entire system of government and justice in Canada, to the point where Crown and constitution are inseparable. Dr. Stephen Phillips, Chair of the Department of Political Science at Langara College, said that the monarchy was more entrenched in Canada than generally realised, having undergone profound changes since Confederation in reaction to and in parallel with Canada's transition from a self-governing Dominion to a fully sovereign state, thereby pre-empting the rise of any significant republican movement. As the monarchy works satisfactorily and still has a "powerful, if under-stated" symbolic value to English Canadians, republicans are left to build popular support for its abolition, necessitating the suggestion of constitutional reform, from which Canadians commonly recoil, and causing a debate that monarchists feel would be nationally divisive.

=== First Nations, Quebec and multiculturalism ===
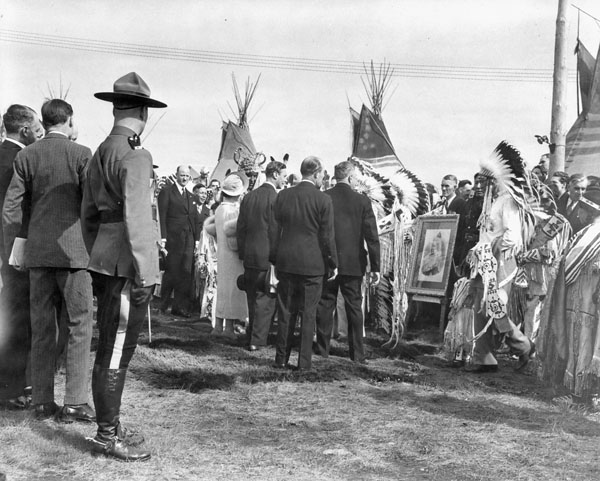
George VI and Queen Elizabeth meet with Nakoda chieftains, who display an image of the King's great-grandmother, Queen Victoria, in Calgary, 1939

Canada's aboriginal peoples have been described as "strongly supportive of the monarchy", due partly to the constitutionally entrenched fiduciary obligations of the monarch alone to be the negotiator between First Nations and non-and provide to the former certain guarantees, which all makes the Crown's inherent stability and continuity, as opposed to the transitory nature of populist whims, an important factor to aboriginal people in Canada; Tony Hall has argued that the "living heritage" of Crown-First Nations treaties must not be sacrificed to reductivist republican views of constitutional change that do not consider the relations between the Crown and Canadian aboriginal peoples. Further, those loyal to the Crown have felt that aboriginal peoples in Canada cherish their ability to present grievances directly to the sovereign before the witness of international cameras.

Quebec in the latter half of the 20th century has been regarded as less inclined towards the Crown. However, it was expressed by Jacques Rouillard that from the mid-19th century until the end of the Second World War, in Quebec the monarchy was seen as a source of democracy that permitted the prosperity of French Canada. At the time of Confederation, there existed French-Canadian royalists who favoured the retention of the monarchy in the new polity that would include the new province of Quebec, some 40 years before Raymond Auzias-Turenne published in Montreal his book République royale, extolling the virtues of constitutional monarchy, and of monarchism in the province, Prime Minister of Canada Wilfrid Laurier stated: "people are surprised at the attachment French Canadians feel for the Queen, and we are faithful to the great nation which has given us liberty." In 2007, though polls showed the province's population to be that which held the monarch most unfavourably, and despite threats of violence and protest from separatists, the Executive Council of Quebec and the Mayor of Quebec City, Régis Labeaume, desired the attendance of Elizabeth II, or either Prince William or Prince Harry, at the 400th anniversary of the founding of Quebec.

Monarchists have also come to find that the Canadian monarchy correlates well with multiculturalism, the monarch being a living illustration of the concept: the Crown's non-partisanship extends to culture and religion, the sovereign reigns over multiple socially diverse nations, appoints persons of each gender and different races to be viceroy, and is him or herself of a heritage that including more than 30 ethnicities, from Danish to Mongol. The monarchy has also been seen by new Canadian citizens as a favourable symbol; in the late 1950s, for instance, recent immigrants from Eastern Bloc countries made public expressions of loyalty to the Queen and criticism towards those who were dismissive of the Crown. Indeed, Member of Parliament Hubert Badanai said during Queen Elizabeth II's 1959 tour of Canada that "non-Anglo Saxons are more keen about the Queen than the Anglo Saxons". Alistair Horne observed at the same time that, while Canada's cultural mix grew, the monarchy remained held in high regard: "At its lowest common denominator, to the average Canadian—whether of British, French or Ukrainian extraction— the Crown is the one thing that he has that the rich and mighty Americans have not got. It makes him feel a little superior." Some, such as journalist Christina Blizzard, emphasise that the monarchy "made [Canada] a haven of peace and justice for immigrants from around the world". Michael Valpy contended that the Crown's nature permitted non-conformity amongst its subjects, thereby opening the door to multiculturalism and pluralism.

In regards to the anti-Catholic provisions of the Canadian constitution, monarchists either see them as a non-issue, as no one who is Catholic is near to the throne in the line of succession, or see them as a discriminatory clauses of a law for which, as it was enacted by elected parliamentarians in Britain and inherited by Canada with Canadian parliamentary approval, the monarchy cannot be held responsible, and can be altered by parliament to repeal the offending parts. The Succession to the Throne Act, 2013, for example, ended the historical disqualification of a person who married a Roman Catholic from the line of succession.

== Democratic principles and governmental role ==
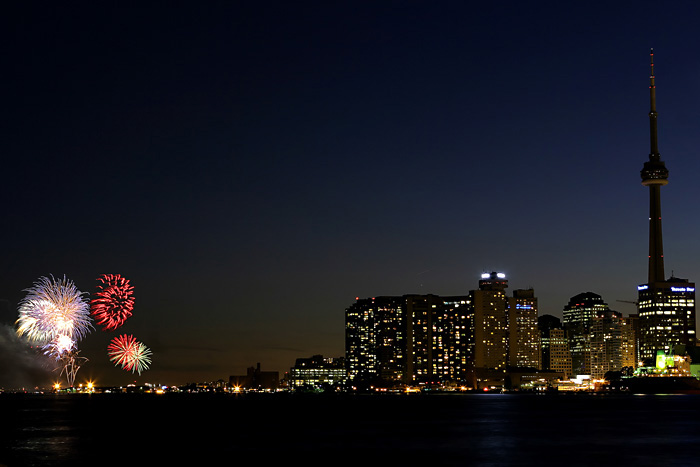
Fireworks at Toronto in 2008 celebrate Victoria Day, both the natural birthday of Queen Victoria and official birthday of the reigning Canadian monarch.

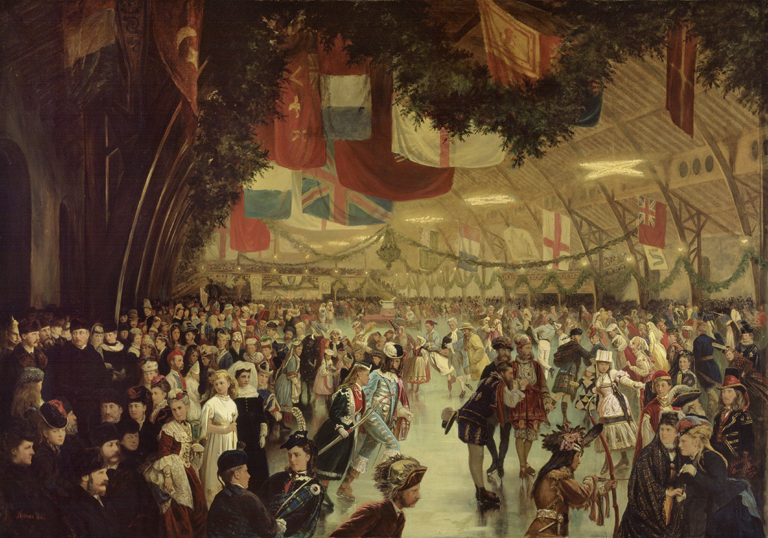
A skating party held in Montreal to celebrate a visit to the city by Prince Arthur, Duke of Connaught and Strathearn.

Monarchists in Canada uphold that "the old view that democracy and monarchy are fundamentally incompatible has been proven wrong" by countries such as Norway, Sweden, Belgium, Spain, and the like; and there is no reason why Canada is different. Not only is a monarch trained from birth to be a competent head of state, they argue, but also that constitutional monarchy is a democratic institution, given that the monarch's position is created and filled by and according to the Canadian constitution, which continues to be supported by the Canadian people through their elected representatives in parliament. It has been noted that such a system is already built on republican principles, wherein the Crown's power has, since long before Confederation, been tempered by the will of the elected legislature, coming directly into play only when an elected individual abuses the power lent to him.

Arguments against the monarchy include the idea that the existence of the Royal Family prevents Canada from becoming a meritocracy, the royal clan being "the prime representation of a class system that divides the nation not on ability but by the hidden mechanisms of privilege". Against that, and in a reversal of the republican derision that they comprise are a modern "Flat Earth Society", however, monarchists declare that such thoughts are quaint and outdated; the modernization of the monarchy has given the country "a figurehead which is as apolitical as it could possibly be" and a royal family that acts as a symbol of a modern, democratic, and multicultural meritocracy. The dignity of the monarchy above partisan politics has also been said by Peter Boyce to have "underlined the distinction between polity and executive" and fostered trust in political institutions.

The system is generally viewed by supporters of the monarchy as well functioning, and, as such, adhere to the analogy of "if it ain't broke, don't fix it". Along those lines, at a 1968 constitutional conference in which Quebec delegates raised the proposal of a republic, the other provincial representatives agreed that the monarchy had worked well and was not a matter for discussion; two years later Pierre Trudeau, who was by then in the Cabinet of Lester Pearson, said: "I wouldn't lift a finger to get rid of the monarchy ... I think the monarchy, by and large, has done more good than harm to Canada." Later, Trudeau said: "Canadians should realise when they are well off under the monarchy. For the vast majority of Canadians, being a monarchy is probably the only form of government acceptable to them. I have always been for parliamentary democracy and I think the institution of monarchy with the Queen heading it all has served Canada well." Former Governor General Roland Michener said in a 1970 speech to the Empire Club of Canada: "Canadians refuse to consider the question at all on the simple ground that what we have works. Isn't this the acid test of any system?"; and one of his viceregal successors, Ed Schreyer, stated: "on a list of 100 things that need fixing, the monarchy ranks 101st."

Though political scholar David Smith theorised that the Canadian monarchy had benefited from the dearth of discussion around it, he also expressed his feeling that those monarchist arguments in favour of the Crown that focused on legalities, despite their strong legislative and logical foundations, were actually counter-productive, serving only to further distance average Canadians from their monarchy, which they perceived mostly through the filter of mass media.

=== Non-partisanship ===
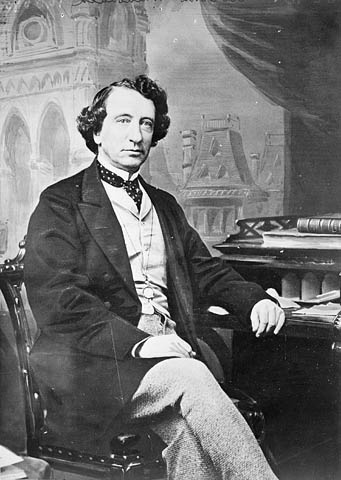
John A. Macdonald, one of the Fathers of Confederation, who upheld the monarchical principle in Canada.

The monarchy in Canada has undergone profound change since Confederation. Indeed, far from being a static institution mired in the past, it has been remarkably versatile. Particularly relevant here is the process by which an indivisible Imperial Crown was superseded by a divisible Canadian Crown.

— Stephen Phillips, 2002

The institution was used as the bedrock of the constitution because it was viewed by the Fathers of Confederation as a guarantor of Canadians' "life, liberty, and prosperity", and a body that was both inclusive and still subject to the rule of law; parliament, of which the monarch is one of the three pillars, spoke for all. The sovereign was also seen as an ideal representative of the Canadian state, as opposed to a president, who, due to the election process, would simply be another politician, always accompanied by an inherent amount of division between his or her supporters and detractors, and therefore unable to appear as non-partisan and unbiased as a constitutional monarch. This "rigorously neutral civic identity" at the national level, monarchists argue, benefits democracy as the sovereign and his or her viceroys are free to represent all Canadians, un-reliant on blocks of voters divided by age, race, gender, financial worth, or political leanings, appealing to, for example, Farley Mowat, a self-described New Democrat and socialist; Eugene Forsey, a trade unionist and founder of the Co-operative Commonwealth Federation, precursor to the New Democratic Party; George Grant, a Red Tory; and Dalton Camp, a Progressive Conservative.

Monarchists opine that in a country such as Canada, where regional, linguistic, and cultural divisions already exist, a divisive head of state would be detrimental rather than beneficial; it was said by George-Étienne Cartier that symbolizing the entire nation is "one reason monarchs flourish in countries split by ethnicity", and that the monarchy permitted "the formation of a political nationality where a cultural nationality was not possible". As Governor General the Lord Tweedsmuir put it, the monarch was "the friend of every citizen, but the master of none, for friendship implies a noble equality", and a link not only between all the peoples of every country that shared the same king in a personal union-type relationship, but also those of Canada. W. L. Morton felt that because Canadians owed their allegiance to a monarch, rather than to a concept like "the People", there was no pressure on anyone to conform to a singular Canadian way of life; he said "the society of allegiance admits of a diversity the society of compact does not, and one of the blessings of Canadian life is that there is no Canadian way of life, much less two, but a unity under the Crown admitting of a thousand diversities".

John A. Macdonald, speaking in 1865 about the proposals for the upcoming Confederation of Canada, said:

By adhering to the monarchical principle we avoid one defect inherent in the Constitution of the United States. By the election of the president by a majority and for a short period, he never is the sovereign and chief of the nation. He is never looked up to by the whole people as the head and front of the nation. He is at best but the successful leader of a party. This defect is all the greater on account of the practice of reelection. During his first term of office he is employed in taking steps to secure his own reelection, and for his party a continuance of power. We avoid this by adhering to the monarchical principle – the sovereign whom you respect and love. I believe that it is of the utmost importance to have that principle recognized so that we shall have a sovereign who is placed above the region of party – to whom all parties look up; who is not elevated by the action of one party nor depressed by the action of another; who is the common head and sovereign of all."

Indeed, five years prior, it was said that Canadians' enthusiasm for the Prince of Wales (later Edward VII), during his 1860 tour of Canada was "the intelligent appreciation by a free people of a principle of government and law, which is above party ... It is in this that a free monarchy is distinguished from a free republic on the one side and an arbitrary despotism on the other – as the personification of impartial authority and supreme law and not the head of a party." In the late 1930s, Tweedsmuir said in a speech that, while the will of the populace prevailed through their election of parliamentary representatives, the King embodied the people on a higher level, above all the "mutations and vicissitudes of parties", and some 60 years later, New Democratic Party Member of Parliament Bill Blaikie opined: "[The Queen] symbolizes for many the merits of a constitutional monarchy in which the head of state ... is separate and apart from the ongoing political struggles of the day", a sentiment echoed in 2009 by American-born, Simon Fraser University professor Anthony Perl.

=== Constitutional guarantor ===
Canadians should realise when they are well off under the monarchy. For the vast majority of Canadians, being a monarchy is probably the only form of government acceptable to them. I have always been for parliamentary democracy and I think the institution of monarchy with the Queen heading it all has served Canada well.

— Pierre Trudeau, 1973

But for all those who don't want the Queen there are easily as many who don't want a President and even more who certainly would not want one if they knew who it would be. As you can readily see, I have given more thought to this subject than most and I have reached my own conclusion. God save the Queen.

— Dalton Camp, 23 August 1994

Monarchists consider that the monarch's position apart from the machinations of politics allows him or her to work as an effective intermediary between Canada's various levels of government and political parties; an indispensable feature in a federal system. It is thus reasoned that the monarchy makes the provinces in their fields of jurisdiction equally as potent as the federal authority, allowing for a flexible and sustainable federalism that thwarts "the political, academic and journalistic elites" in Canada. During constitutional talks in the 1970s, the provinces did not endorse any alterations to the Crown in either its federal or provincial fields, all agreeing that the Crown "has served us well", and later analysis by David Smith showed that the federal Cabinet at the time failed both to understand the complexity of the Canadian Crown and to "recognize its federalist dimension," the monarchy being said to be crucial to provincial co-sovereignty. Even beyond provincial geo-politics, the monarchy has been said to be the only body in which Canadian sovereignty can be vested, as none of the alternatives, the people or the nation, has enough cohesiveness in Canada to serve the purpose. The Irish presidency, which Canadian republicans theorise could be copied in Canada, is not the head of a federated country and thus a hypothetical Canadian president's role would not be the same as that in Ireland.

Monarchists, such as the Lord Tweedsmuir, felt that, despite having some drawbacks, constitutional monarchy offered greater stability, it's being seldom thought of an illustration that it was working properly. This, loyalists assert, is because the Crown's non-partisanship permits it to be a permanent guarantor against the misuse of constitutional power by transitory politicians for their own personal gain, the monarch being a required co-signatory to political instruments and having a personal stake in protecting constitutional government from non-justifiable abuses, but having no policy powers or job security reliant on the prime minister of the day. As Forsey and George Grant put it, by simply being there, the sovereign denies more sinister forces, such as a partisan or corrupt president, access to the state's power, forming a "vital safeguard of democracy and liberty" by acting as a "bulwark against cabinet despotism", or as "the last bulwark of democracy", as former Quebec Premier Daniel Johnson, Jr. put it; the worth of the monarchy being not its power, but the power it denies any other person. Thus, the reserve powers of the Crown and the peculiar nature of the office holder are viewed as making the position a useful, if limited, asset against the "presidential" aspirations of prime ministers, and a superior safeguard for executive oversight than any republican alternative. As Andrew Coyne described it, the sovereign's supremacy over the Prime Minister in the constitutional order is a "rebuff to the pretensions of the elected: As it has been said, when the Prime Minister bows before the Queen, he bows before us". The analogy monarchists use is that the Crown is like a fire extinguisher, rarely used, but highly visible, and there in case of emergencies.

Monarchists thus see the monarch, unconnected with to party politics, as "a political referee, not a political player, and there is a lot of sense in choosing the referee by a different principle from the players. It lessens the danger that the referee might try to start playing." They further theorise that having both an elected president and prime minister could lead to the two coming to odds over who holds more authority; each could claim to be "elected by the people", as happened in the Congo in 1960, Burma in 2004, and East Timor in 2006. The Canadian republican group Citizens for a Canadian Republic has proposed the Governor General be elected as a step towards some form of republic, to which monarchists counter that this move would bring divisiveness to the office, citing the situation that emerged in 2004 between the rival candidates for the viceregal office in fellow Commonwealth realm Papua New Guinea, where the nominee for governor-general is selected by parliamentary vote. To the idea that the head of state be selected by the Companions of the Order of Canada, monarchists have said that such a situation would "politicise and destroy" the Canadian honours system by turning it into a form of electoral college, and they further counter Edward McWhinney's notion that Canada could become a republic simply by failing to proclaim another sovereign upon the next Demise of the Crown, stating that such a proposal ignores the necessity of provincial input, and "would be contrary to the plain purpose of those who framed our system of government".

== Quebec sovereignty ==
The Canadian monarchy has been presented by monarchists in Canada as being a continuation of the French monarchy under which New France was founded, the Lieutenant Governor of Quebec representing the sovereign in "the same way representatives of the French Crown were resident in Château St-Louis". It is further argued that, as with the rest of Canada, Quebec has never been a republican order, and monarchism is not an alien concept to the populace of the province. (Note: Wilfrid Laurier opined in 1908 that Quebecers were "monarchical by religion, by habit, and by the remembrance of past history," and in 1953 it was said by Robert J. C. Stead that "French Canada is unswervingly loyal to the monarchy".) Moreover, far from being dismissive of the French heritage of Canada, the country's royalty has always gone to allowable lengths to ensure the inclusion and appreciation of that culture.

In response to the republican claim that Canada becoming a republic would appease the drive for Quebec sovereignty, monarchists say that those in Quebec who wish for their province to secede from confederation rely on anti-British, historical revisionism, and view any federal authority as repressive, regardless of whether that authority is republican or monarchical; hence, the future of the monarchy is regarded as a non-issue by separatist parties like the Bloc and Parti Québécois. Monarchists also say that Canadian presidents would be more often selected by and/or from the majority Anglophone population of the country, and thus sovereigntists would argue that Québécois are not being represented by the head of state. Even if a sovereignty-association relationship with Canada was established, questions remain as to whether or not Quebec would truly be free of the Canadian monarchy. (Note: University of Toronto Professor Richard Toporoski held the theory that a sovereign, not independent, Quebec would still be under the sovereignty of the Queen; he said: "the real problem ... is not separation from Canada: Quebec has said that it wishes to preserve common elements – Canadian currency (issued officially by whom? – the Queen of Canada), for example, and the possibility of Quebec citizens being Canadian citizens (and who are Canadian citizens? – subjects of the Queen).")

== Loyal organizations in Canada ==
Prince Edward, Earl of Wessex speaks with some youth members of the Monarchist League of Canada at a reception held at Toronto's Spoke Club, 2005.

- Monarchist League of Canada
- Grand Orange Lodge of Canada
- Royal Society of St. George
- United Empire Loyalist Association

== See also ==
- Debate on the monarchy in Canada
- Republicanism in Canada
- Monarchy of Canada and the Indigenous peoples of Canada
- Monarchy
- Monarchism
