= Monarchist League of Canada =

Canadian monarchist advocacy organization

- The heraldic badge granted to the Monarchist League of Canada.
- Founded: February 23, 1970
- Founder: John Aimers
- Type: Nonprofit organization
- Purpose: Monarchism in Canada
- Location: Oakville, Ontario
- Region served: Canada
- Key people: Robert Finch (Dominion Chairman)
- Website: www.monarchist.ca

The Monarchist League of Canada (French: Ligue monarchiste du Canada) is a Canadian nonprofit monarchist advocacy organization. This league promotes its aims in three areas: education, advocacy, and research. Local branches and many under the patronage of lieutenant governors, complement these areas of focus by acting as a grassroots rallying point for members.

== History ==
The coat of arms of the Monarchist League of Canada, granted by the Canadian Heraldic Authority, with permission of Elizabeth II, Queen of Canada

The Monarchist League of Canada was founded in 1970 by John Aimers and was federally incorporated in 1976. It was established after Aimers attended a 1969 tour of Canada by Lieutenant Colonel JC du Parc Braham, chancellor of the London-based International Monarchist League. The newly formed MLC inherited a list of 50 Canadian members of the British-based league and held its first public meeting several months later at Ottawa, in June 1970. Within a year, the League claimed 3,000 members and 10 branches across Canada.

In the 1960s and 1970s, there was a growing mood of Canadian and Québécois nationalism and criticism from opponents of monarchy who perceived the institution as an archaic and foreign symbol of colonialism and the British Empire. In an effort to create a new national identity, the Canadian government responded by removing some traditional symbols of the Canadian monarchy. For example, the Queen's Printer for Canada assumed a less visible role and the Royal Mail was renamed Canada Post.

Supporters of the monarchy were alarmed by these changes and formed the League as a lobby group in favour of the retention of the traditional symbols of monarchy and against what it described as "creeping republicanism" that would result in the eventual transformation of Canada from a constitutional monarchy into a republic. Through the same decade, the league was heavily involved in opposition against constitutional amendment proposals that would have created the governor general as head of state above the monarch.

Though failing to prevent erosion in some areas, the league successfully lobbied the Government of Canada to maintain a Canadian version of the Victoria Cross as Canada's highest military decoration and to maintain the monarch's place in the Oath of Citizenship. The league also persuaded Canada Post to issue the Queen Elizabeth II definitive stamp, bearing the image of the then-monarch, Elizabeth II, as a mandatory item in all postal outlets.

== Current activities ==
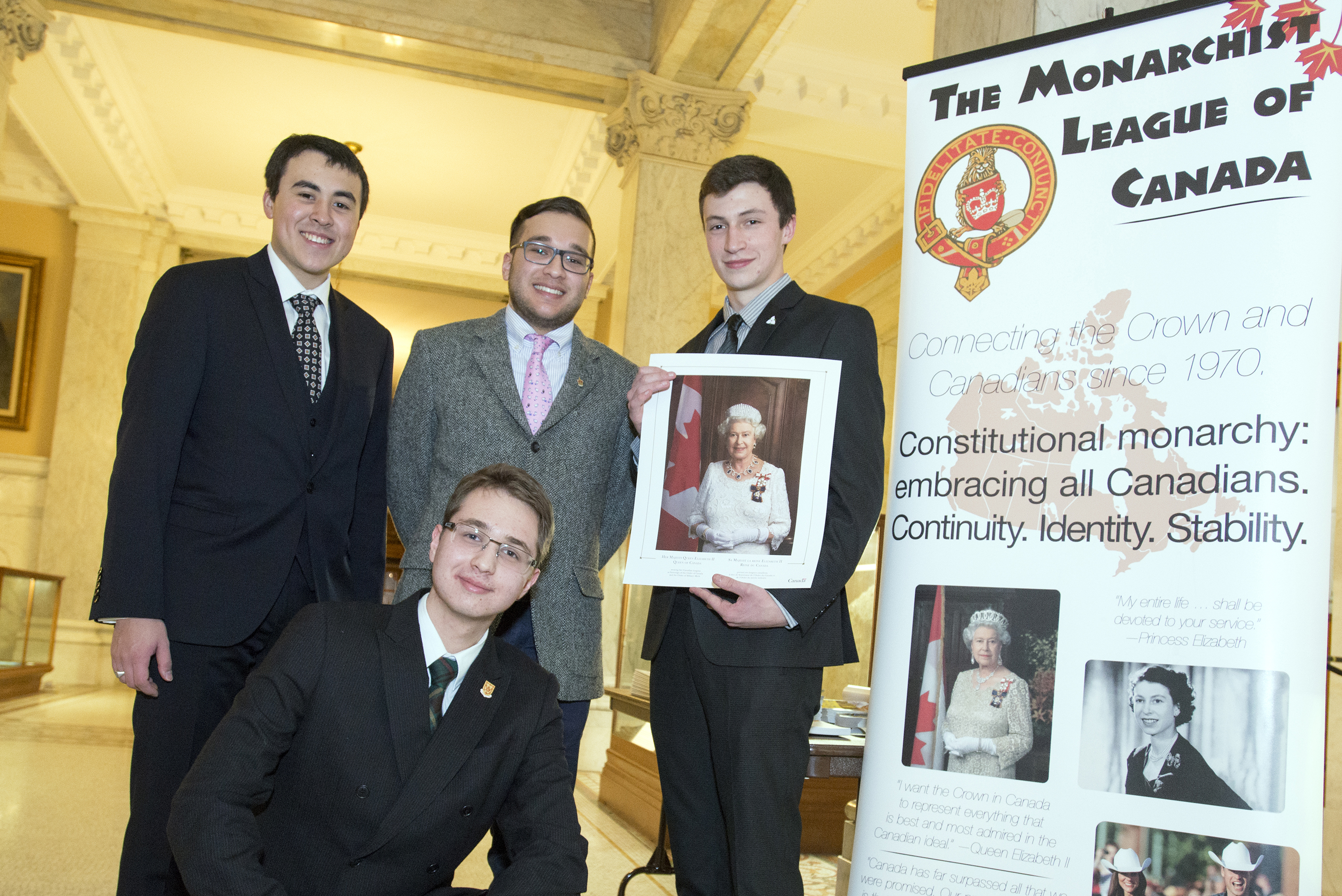
Members of the Monarchist League of Canada promote the league at the New Year's Day levee at the viceregal suite in the Ontario Legislative Building, Toronto, 2015

=== Education ===
Educating Canadians about the role of the Crown has long been one of the League's primary goals. As a supplement to provincial educational resources, the league produced and distributed "Red Boxes" (modelled after the King's own boxes in which he receives diplomatic and state papers), containing information about the Crown and related activities. Production of these toolkits ceased in 2006 to make way for a new wave of educational material.

In 2006, the league released a 36-page educational booklet entitled The Canadian Monarchy: Exploring the role of Canada's Crown in the day-to-day life of our country and a new education section on its website.

=== Advocacy ===
The league actively lobbies the federal and provincial governments, individual politicians, Crown corporations, government agencies, the media, and others to promote awareness of the role of the monarchy. This is often in the form of organized letter-writing campaigns or through behind-the-scenes manoeuvring.

Since 2005, the league has been engaged in an active campaign to restore the monarch's name to Canadian diplomatic letters of credence and recall.

=== Research ===
The league commissions a study on the actual cost of the Canadian monarchy every three years, the most recent of which was completed in 2021. The survey is distributed to members, media, and parliamentarians, and it is available for download on the League's website.

=== Other activities ===
Prince Edward, Earl of Wessex speaks with members at a League reception held at the Spoke Club in Toronto, 2005.

The league is considered by many as being the recognized voice of Canadian monarchism. Often, members are called upon to engage in debate on television and radio shows, or offer commentary on occasions of royal significance.

The league stages various national and regional social events throughout the year.

The league has welcomed Andrew Mountbatten-Windsor, Prince Edward and his wife Sophie, and Princess Anne, giving Canadian royals opportunity to meet its volunteers and members. Individual branches also organize luncheons, banquets, receptions and lectures, where senators, members of parliament, members of legislative assemblies, academics and other prominent citizens participate as guest speakers.

== Canadian Monarchist News ==
Canadian Monarchist News (French: Les Nouvelles Monarchiques du Canada) is the newsletter of the Monarchist League of Canada. It publishes articles on the activities of the Crown, the royal family, as well as the representatives of the Crown (governors general and lieutenant governors).

== Organization ==
=== National ===
The league is governed by a Board of Directors, and other national officers are appointed by the Chairman. Since 2007, Robert Finch has been the league's Dominion Chairman and Chief Executive Officer.

=== Branches ===
The league sanctions local branches and contact groups throughout Canada to serve as a rallying point for members and undertake a variety of activities in an effort to influence local opinion in favour of the Crown. There are currently over 20 branches/contact groups across the country:

- Newfoundland and Labrador
- Nova Scotia: Halifax, Annapolis Valley, Pictou County, Nova Scotia, Northumberland, South West Nova
- New Brunswick: Provincial
- Quebec: Quebec City and District, Montreal
- Ontario: Ottawa, Belleville, Peterborough, Barrie-Simcoe, Toronto, Hamilton and District, Niagara Region, Guelph-Grand River, University of Waterloo, Wilfrid Laurier University, Brant County, London, Windsor, North-West Ontario
- Manitoba: Winnipeg
- Saskatchewan: South Saskatchewan (Regina), North Saskatchewan (Saskatoon)
- Alberta: Calgary, Northern Alberta
- British Columbia: Vancouver, Victoria, Central Vancouver Island, Courtenay-Comox Valley

=== Young Monarchists ===
The League maintains an active youth wing called the Young Monarchists. The primary focus of the Young Monarchists is to connect members of the league aged 25 and under.

The Young Monarchist Group was originally formed by university students Graeme Scotchmer and Daniel Whaley, who started the group when they were young teenagers.

The league maintains five university branches, one at the University of Waterloo, another at Wilfrid Laurier University, a third at the University of Toronto, a branch at Queen's University and one at the University of Ottawa. Young volunteers play a central part in the regional and national work of the League. Summer student internships have been sponsored in partnership with the Office of the Lieutenant Governor of Ontario in Toronto and the Office of the lieutenant governor of British Columbia in Victoria.

== See also ==
- Monarchism in Canada
- Monarchy of Canada
- Debate on the monarchy in Canada
- Citizens for a Canadian Republic
