= Debate on the monarchy in Canada =

Political issue in Canada

Debate between monarchists and republicans in Canada has been taking place since before the country's Confederation in 1867, though it has rarely been of significance since the rebellions of 1837. Open support for republicanism only came from the Patriotes in the early 19th century, the Red River Métis in 1869, and minor actions by the Fenians in the 19th century. However, paralleling the changes in constitutional law that saw the creation of a distinct Canadian monarchy, the emergence in the 1960s of Quebec nationalism, and the evolution of Canadian nationalism, the cultural role and relevance of the monarchy was altered and was sometimes questioned in certain circles, while continuing to receive support in others.

In 2005, it was estimated that only 0.6 per cent of the population was actively engaged in any debate about a republic. The Monarchist League of Canada's chief executive officer, Robert Finch, stated the greatest threat to the monarchy is not republicanism, "it is indifference."

== The debate ==
=== The first 100 years ===
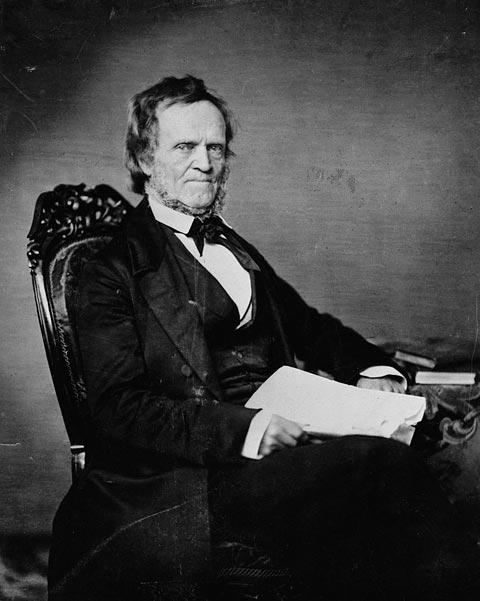
William Lyon Mackenzie, circa 1855

In the early 19th century, reform-minded groups began to emerge in the British colonies in Canada. From them rose William Lyon Mackenzie, who desired a US-style republic for Canada, and Louis-Joseph Papineau. Their causes were countered by the lieutenant governors and members of the executive councils at the time, as well as a majority of the colonists, who did not espouse a break with the Crown, Still, in the lead-up to Confederation in 1867, there did take place debate over whether the new polity should adopt a republican or monarchical form of government.

Alistair Horne observed in the late 1950s that, while Canada's cultural mix grew, the monarchy remained held in high regard: "At its lowest common denominator, to the average Canadian—whether of British, French or Ukrainian extraction—the Crown is the one thing that he has that the rich and mighty Americans have not got. It makes him feel a little superior." However, at the same time, he noted that the institution was coming more into question in Quebec and that it was sometimes perceived as having a "colonial taint", but theorized that this was because Canadians had an inferiority complex in relation to the British. At the same time, controversy arose in the run-up to the Queen's 1959 tour, when Canadian Broadcasting Corporation personality Joyce Davidson said in an interview with Dave Garroway on NBC's Today Show, "like most Canadians, I am indifferent to the visit of the Queen." The CBC was thereafter flooded with telephone calls from angry Canadians, as well as letters supporting Davidson. Co-operative Commonwealth Federation Member of Parliament Frank Howard agreed with Davidson, but, many more did not, with some demanding Prime Minister John Diefenbaker "do something". Mayor of Toronto Nathan Phillips spoke out against Davidson as well.

=== Constitutional evolution ===
Debates over the monarchy and its place in Canada took place through the 1960s and 1970s, following the rise of Quebec nationalism. Republican options were discussed following the sovereigntist Parti Québécois' (PQ) election to power in Quebec, but, only specifically in relation to the province. However, the non-Quebecer attendees at the 1968 constitutional conference agreed that the monarchy had worked well and was not a matter for discussion. In 1966, when the Queen of Canada's consort, Prince Philip, Duke of Edinburgh, undertook a royal tour through Montreal, Ottawa, and Toronto, he said that, if Canadians found the monarchy no longer useful, they could get rid of it without opposition from anyone in the royal family. As the Monarchist League of Canada later put it, "this characteristically outspoken remark—undoubtedly mirroring the sovereign's views—allowed such republican sentiment as existed to be discussed openly in Ottawa and through the country with the result that, some 60 years on, the institution functions well and is entrenched in Canada's constitution."

The Cabinet, in June 1978, put forward the constitutional amendment Bill C-60 that, among other changes, potentially affected the sovereign's role as head of state by vesting executive authority in the governor general and renaming the position as First Canadian. Some academics, such as Ted McWhinney, supported these proposals; though, they were opposed by others, like the editorial board of The Globe and Mail and Senator Eugene Forsey, who said that the government had managed to "[stir] up a hornet's nest with a short stick." From that year's First Ministers' conference in Regina, Saskatchewan, the provincial premiers (including that of Quebec) issued a statement against what they saw as a unilateral attempt by the federal government to push through alterations to the monarchy and expressed their opposition to "constitutional changes that substitute for the Queen as ultimate authority a governor general whose appointment and dismissal would be solely the pleasure of the federal Cabinet"—a message reiterated at the conclusion of the 1979 meeting. Decades later, David Smith stated that the federal government at the time had "misperceived the complexity of the Crown [and] failed [...] to recognize its federalist dimension."

=== Into the 21st century ===
Debate on the monarchy was seen through the first decade of the 21st century in other Canadian media, generally at times of national significance, such as Canada Day and Victoria Day, or during a royal tour.

After Prime Minister Jean Chrétien's press secretary, Peter Donolo, in 1998 unaccountably announced through a media story that the prime minister's office was considering the abolition of the monarchy as a millennium project, Chrétien stated that he was open to a public debate, but never pursued the matter and expressed concerns about resulting divisions, saying that he "already had enough trouble on [his] hands with the separatists of Quebec, and didn't want to take on the monarchists in the rest of Canada, too."

Other media at the time noted that, though there was "no longer any strong idea behind the Canadian monarchy and its representative", in the absence of which "there can be no pulse in common between the people and their constitution", there simply was no debate about any republic among the general populace, with discussion limited to a political and journalistic few. (Note: Valpy claimed about the debate: "The push to get rid of the Canadian monarchy comes from people like Citizenship Minister Lucienne Robillard who don't understand it, from people in the Prime Minister's Office desperate for something to merchandise as an idea, and from an arid assemblage of academic, bureaucratic and journalistic elites cemented into some curious antediluvian profession of anti-colonialism and sort-of nationalism indecipherable in 1999 to all but themselves.") An inadequate number of willing participants was pointed to as a reason for this phenomenon—which was seen as a manifestation of what Carolyn Tuohy had called Canada's "institutionalized ambivalence"—as well as a lack of alternate model to be discussed, with no method put forward by which the powers of the Crown could be soundly transferred to a president, no definitive solution to where Canadian sovereignty would be placed should the sovereign be removed from Canada, (Note: Reg Whitaker said on this: "If sovereignty is now to be vested in the Canadian nation or the Canadian people, what precisely is this? Is it Canada including a Quebec that thinks of itself as a different, perhaps separate nation? Is it Preston Manning's "New Canada", shorn one way or another of a distinctive Quebec? Is it a two-headed, dualist sovereign nation, perhaps even sprouting additional heads—Aboriginal nations, regional identities—like some genetically engineered Medusa?") nor any means by which the constitutionally required consent of all 11 parliaments (one federal and 10 provincial) could be achieved. It was also theorized that Canadians had a growing sense of distrust for politicians (which a president would be), more pressing issues to deal with, and no appetite for nationally divisive constitutional change. Political scholar David Smith expressed his thoughts on how the Canadian monarchy had benefited from this dearth of discussion.

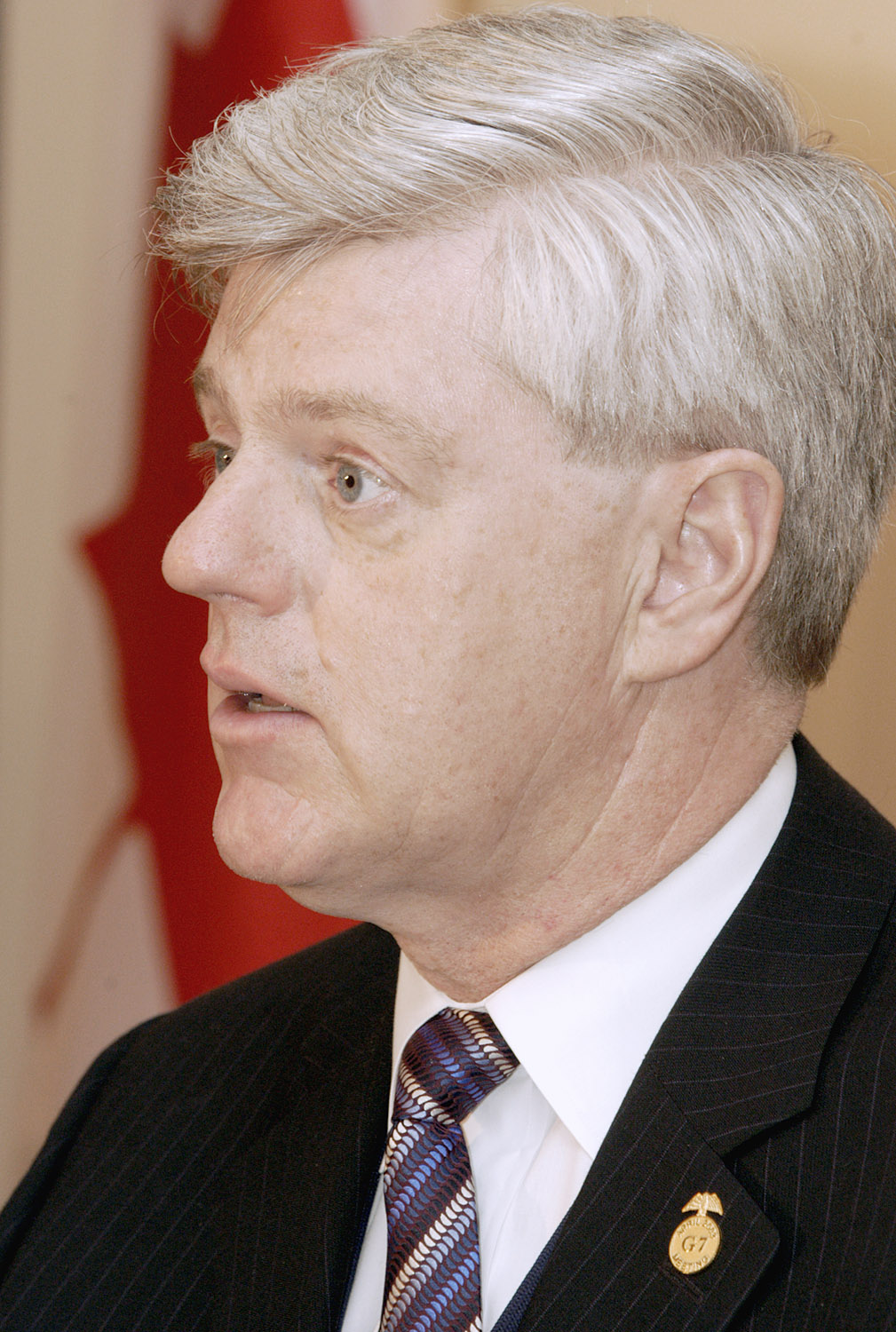
Former deputy prime minister and minister of the Crown, John Manley

John Manley, a minister of the Crown from 1993 to 2003, was openly critical of the monarchy, beginning in 1997. He said in 2001 that the Canadian Crown was "an institution that's a bit out of date for Canada to continue with" and, when the Queen arrived for her Golden Jubilee tour the following year, Manley stated to reporters, "I don't think it's necessary for Canada to continue with the monarchy". In 2007, the Minister for Intergovernmental Affairs in Quebec, Benoît Pelletier, expressed his opinion that it was "not impossible that we might have to reconsider the role of the monarch, the lieutenant governor, and the governor general [...] I'm not saying that the monarchy must be abolished. But, it will take some thought, especially on its usefulness and relevance.

Into the 2020s, the Monarchist League of Canada claimed, "opponents of the Canadian Crown frequently criticize the monarchy without fully being aware of the facts. In addition, opponents often deliberately spread misinformation." Peter Woolstencroft, a retired political science professor from the University of Waterloo, opined in 2021 that "the optimal republican pathway seems to rest upon attrition through rising indifference." However, he went on to write, "Canada's constitutional straitjacket makes abolition here highly unlikely. At best, it would take a long and contentious process, something Canadians likely do not want;" considering the differences in methods of choosing a president, in the sizes of the provinces and territories, and of their populations, in addition to the treaty relationship between First Nations and the Crown, Woolstencroft observed "over the long arc of previous constitutional discussions, a clear pattern is discernible. Matters on the table become more diverse, more complicated, more symbolically existential, with a widening set of actors, making it harder and harder to produce a coherent agreement."

=== Reign of Charles III ===
Following Elizabeth II's death in September 2022, Canadian Prime Minister Justin Trudeau stated that the monarchy's role in Canada was not open for debate and did not see Canada replacing its monarchy in the near future. During an in-person meeting with King Charles III in London, UK, Trudeau described the monarchy as offering Canada "steadiness." The following month, Bloc Québécois leader Yves-François Blanchet tabled a motion in the House of Commons, proposing that the "House express its desire to sever ties [sic] between the Canadian state and the British monarchy [sic]." Blanchet did not suggest an alternative form of government. The House rejected the motion by 266 votes to 44. Most members of Parliament condemned the move as a political stunt, as the Bloc's main aim is the separation of Quebec from Canada. Ten New Democratic Party MPs, one Liberal, one Green, and one Conservative turned independent MP supported the motion. (Note: Respectively, Charlie Angus, Niki Ashton, Alexandre Boulerice, Laurel Collins, Don Davies, Blake Desjarlais, Leah Gazan, Matthew Green, Lori Idlout, and Jenny Kwan of the NDP, Liberal Joël Lightbound, Green Mike Morrice, and Independent Alain Rayes.)

For some decades, many newspaper columnists and pundits had contended the death of Queen Elizabeth II would be the moment to replace Canada's monarchy with a president, giving them time to formulate solid arguments both against the status quo and for the republican system Canada should adopt and how. After Elizabeth passed, however, "remarkably little talk of abolishing the monarchy" was heard and what was uttered was a repeat of what had "been written months or years ago." Among the little that was written, Andrew Cohen complained in The Globe and Mail about Canada's constitutional monarchy being "shallow" and "small-minded", without recommending any alternative system; though, he did argue a "national referendum" and "citizens' assembly" should be added to the constitutional amending process. Retired University of Ottawa professor John E. Trent proposed in the Ottawa Citizen that the governor general be made head of state and, recycling an idea proposed by "a Toronto newspaper" years before, asserted Officers of the Order of Canada should select who occupies the office, something Chris Selley argued in the National Post would politicize both the head of state and the Order of Canada, itself. Selley also opined that "the strangest argument in favour of reform is the notion that it [the monarchy] reflects an 'immature' nation" and, in response, quoted Andrew Wudrick, of the Macdonald-Laurier Institute: "We don't have fighter jets or ships for our military. We can't process passports. We have yearlong waitlists for critical medical procedures. We can't build anything. Maybe our constitutional architecture isn't what's keeping us in prolonged adolescence."

Former Prime Minister Stephen Harper argued, following Elizabeth II's funeral, that the monarchy is "not just the formal head of the country's institutions, but the embodiment of the lives of all the nation's families", making the monarch not just head of state, but head of a national family, and monarchy "performs its functions in a way that a presidency can barely dream of." He did, though, opine that the Canadian monarch has less impact on Canadians than does the British monarch on Britons, noting that the viceroys take the monarch's place in Canada and, therefore, how they are selected should be reconsidered, emphasizing that, in addition to qualities of political non-partisanship and social diversity, they have understanding of the "constitutional nature of their position and [...] the wide responsibilities of such an office." Harper explained that his Advisory Committee on Vice-Regal Appointments had been conceived of as a beginning of a process of creating a more formal means of selecting governors general and lieutenant governors, beyond the sole judgment of the prime minister of the day.

An argument was made by Joseph Brean that the "common anti-monarchist view [is] that Canadians would reject the monarchy if they ever paid it more than passing attention. But they don't, so they don't." He concluded Canadians both believe their monarchy is of no importance and, so, feel there are presently more important issues to contend with than replacement of the Crown, as well as hold an expectation that the monarchy will naturally fade into irrelevance, "but, it never does, and too few people are willing to push." Brean also noted there is no set alternative to constitutional monarchy. The Lord Ashcroft revealed Canadians being polled often said that, in any future referendum on the Canadian monarchy, they would wish to know precisely what they were choosing between.

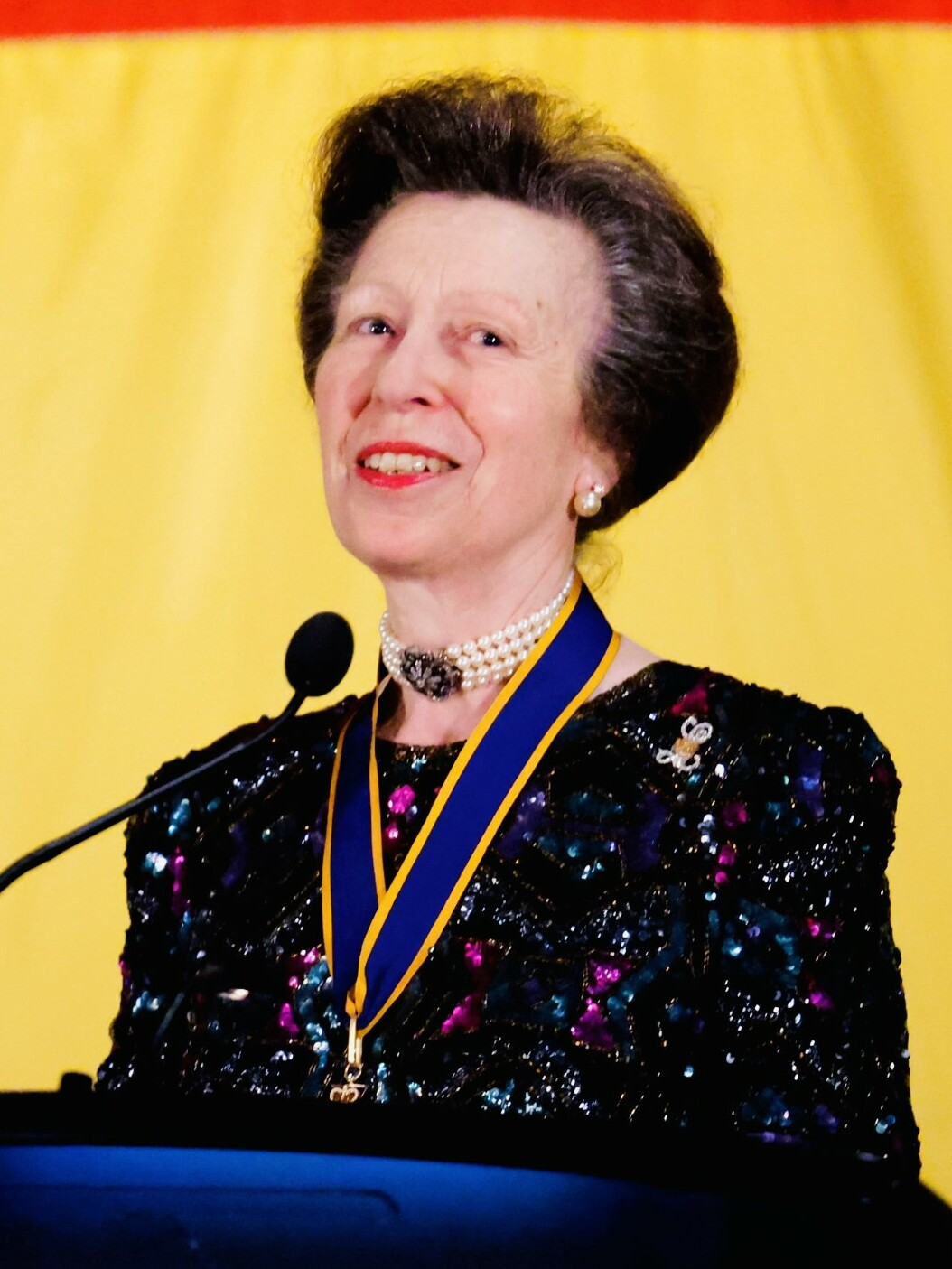
Princess Anne, Princess Royal, in Moncton, New Brunswick, 14 June 2023

In an interview with CBC News ahead of Charles' coronation, Princess Anne, Princess Royal, said the royal family does not deal with polls on the monarchy and explained discussion about the institution's relevance "[is] not a conversation that I would necessarily have". But, the Princess did opine, "I think it's perfectly true that [this] is a moment when you need to have that discussion." She only went so far as to say "the monarchy provides, with the constitution, a degree long-term stability that is actually quite hard to come by any other way [...] I rather hope that, sometimes, what we can do is just to underline the goodness" and provide "an element of focus" to those who are empathetic and serve others "and [encourage] that in the long term. It's not a short-term thing. You're there for the long term."

=== Proposals for a solely Canadian monarch ===
The idea of an exclusively Canadian monarch has been offered; Canadian monarchists have suggested that all Commonwealth realms should have their own resident monarchs. This figure could be descended from the House of Windsor; it was suggested in 2011 that Prince Harry become King of Canada. It has also been proposed that the Canadian monarch have a First Nations lineage, either as a hereditary monarchy or an elective monarchy, with a trilingual requirement in English, French, and a relevant Indigenous Canadian language. However, there has been no popular or official support for such a change.

=== Proposals for leaving the office of the King vacant ===
Ideas have also been raised about removing the monarch from the office of the King and simply leaving the office vacant. A similar proposal is to leave the office vacant but deem that it is held by a natural person; effectively, the office would be held by a fictitious monarch, and the country would have a notional Sovereign. In each of these cases, the Governor General would exercise the King's powers, as they do now, pursuant to the Letters Patent, 1947, and a new means of appointing the Governor General would be necessary.

== Polls ==
Polls on the Canadian monarchy have been regularly conducted since the 1990s, typically coinciding with a royal tour or other major royal event. In 2008, Peter Boyce wrote that successive polls since the aforementioned decade showed an increasing disaffection with the monarchy, but, also noted internal contradictions in specific poll results. In regard to the polling of Canadians, the Lord Ashcroft said in 2023 that "royal fortunes rise and fall."

Polls on the institution have been accused of using "inconsistent and sometimes ambiguous wording." Monarchists assert the use of the adjective "British" in a poll question on the Canadian monarchy or implications that the Canadian head of state is foreign are inaccurate and skews the results, while republicans say the same about the use of "sever" or "abolish". The polls sometimes ask about constitutionally impossible scenarios and consistently ignore both the constitutional requirements for a change to the Canadian monarchy and the existence of the provinces, which would also be affected by constitutional amendments that made Canada a republic.

In addition, it has also been said that Canadians are not well-educated about the constitutional role of the monarchy; in 2002, a poll reported that 69% of those polled thought the prime minister was head of state and only 5% responded that it was the Queen. Both republicans and monarchists in Canada have acknowledged this in relation to polls on the monarchy.

=== 1950s ===
In advance of Queen Elizabeth II's royal tour in 1959, and following Joyce Davidson's public statement on the populace's general indifference toward the tour, a Vancouver Sun poll found 70 per cent of those asked indicated interest in the tour, while 50 per cent approved of the spending for it. Gallup conducted a poll in which 64 per cent of respondents said they disagreed with Davidson, 48 per cent stated they were "very interested" in the tour and 19 per cent "not at all".

=== 1970s ===
When constitutional amendments were being considered in the 1960s, the role of the monarchy was not strenuously questioned, as it was deemed to be "no great priority in the present round of constitutional changes." This statement was reflected in the four opinion polls conducted in 1970, which showed that the monarchy was favoured by two-thirds of those questioned. The Canadian Institute of Public Opinion asked nationally: "Do you think Canada should continue to pay allegiance to the Queen, or do you think we should become a republic with an elected president?" To this, 50 per cent of respondents opted for retention of the status quo, 33 per cent favoured a republic, and the remainder declined to answer. Further, the answers differed by region: of the respondents who lived in Quebec, 46 per cent wished for a republic as against 23 per cent for monarchy, while, in Ontario, the monarchy was favoured well above the national average, and support was even higher in the western provinces. Older persons (over 50 years) were the strongest advocates for the monarchy than any other age group, although those in their 20s who answered the poll also gave their preference for the Crown. Similarly, another poll that year revealed that in Canada, exclusive of Quebec, the monarchy was of no issue to 37 per cent of the people polled and a further 41 per cent rated themselves as loyalists, although many of the older responders "recognised that youth had different ideas which might have an effect in the future."

=== 1990s ===
A 1993 poll by Angus Reid Group asked "thinking about the monarchy's role here in Canada, all things considered, do you think...", to which 45.5 per cent of respondents favoured the answer "preserve connection" and 54.5 per cent favoured "abolish connection".

=== 2000s ===
EKOS Research Associates concluded in 2002, the year of Queen Elizabeth II's Golden Jubilee, there were "highly polarized views" on the monarchy, with "little consensus for moving forward with institutional renewal." The respondents were said to be split on the relevance of the royal family, members being seen both as "interesting" and "tired", while their "historical-institutional significance" was "much more important" than their perception as celebrities; though, this question conflated the royal family with the monarchy and referred to the latter as "British". Support for abolition of the monarchy was noted as declining. A poll by Léger Marketing in the same year found that 50 per cent of those polled believed the monarchy should be preserved, while 43 per cent disagreed.

According to Ipsos-Reid in 2005, "Canadians [were] supportive toward the concept of the constitutional monarchy as Canada's form of government" and 62 per cent of respondents believed the monarchy helped to define Canada's identity. However, at the same time, 48 per cent of those polled agreed "constitutional monarchy is outmoded and would prefer a republican system of government with an elected head of state, like in the United States" and 65 per cent believed that the royals were simply celebrities who should not have any formal role in Canada. The same poll found that 58 per cent of respondents felt "the issue of the monarchy and the form of Canada's government isn't important to them and if the system is working OK why go through all the fuss to change it?"

A 2005 poll by The Strategic Counsel reported Canadians to be uncertain "about the legitimacy and role of the British monarchy remaining as Canada's head of state". The poll found an equal number—47 per cent supporting and 47 per cent opposed—to retention of the "British monarchy". Two years later, Angus Reid Strategies reported that 53 per cent of respondents to its survey felt "Canada should end its formal ties to the British monarchy", while 35 per cent thought the contrary and 12 per cent were unsure. Angus Reid stated in March 2008 the majority of those it polled believe "it is time to end the country's official relationship with either the British monarchy or the monarchy."

An August 2009 poll commissioned by the group Canadian Friends of the Royal Family found that the majority of those who answered, more than 60%, felt that a constitutional monarchy was outdated.

Three polls were conducted two months later: Léger Marketing found that 45 per cent of the respondents considered the monarchy "to be useless to Canada and feel that the country should sever all formal ties with the Queen", while 44 per cent considered the monarchy to be a tradition that should be maintained. Opposition to the institution was strongest in Quebec, where 78 per cent of those asked believed the monarchy is "useless to Canada" and should be ended, and 11 per cent wanted to maintain it. Angus Reid's results showed 27 per cent of those polled preferred Canada to remain a monarchy. The plurality. 35 per cent, preferred Canada to have an elected head of state. When asked whom they would prefer as a monarch after Queen Elizabeth II, the plurality, 37 per cent, of respondents said there should be no monarch after her. The poll by Ipsos Reid found that the majority, 53 per cent, of those who replied wanted Canada to end "its constitutional ties" to the monarchy after the Queen dies, while 49 per cent wanted to abolish the constitutional monarchy structure then and become a republic, with an elected head of state. The majority, 60 per cent, of respondents said the Queen and the royal family should have no formal role in Canadian society and that they are "simply celebrities and nothing more."

In November, another poll by Angus Reid found that two-thirds of those questioned would like to see a Canadian serving as Canada's head of state, while 18 per cent disagreed. Twenty seven per cent preferred Canada to remain a monarchy, while 43% preferred Canada to have an elected head of state.

=== 2010s ===
In May 2010, a poll by Angus Reid found that more than two thirds of those who replied, a 69 per cent majority, would have liked to see a Canadian serving as Canada's head of state and a 52 per cent supported reopening the constitutional debate to discuss replacing the monarchy with an elected head of state, while only 32 per cent opposed doing so. Despite 69 per cent of respondents having a "mostly favourable" opinion of Queen Elizabeth II as a person, 33 per cent preferred Canada to remain a monarchy; 36 per cent said they would prefer to have an elected head of state, 21 per cent were indifferent, and 11 per cent were unsure. When asked who they would prefer as a monarch after Queen Elizabeth II, three-in-ten respondents said there should be no monarch after her and 31 per cent wanted members of the royal family to stop touring Canada. A national poll conducted a month later by the Association for Canadian Studies found 49 per cent of those asked had a negative reaction to the word "monarchy", compared to 41 per cent with a positive reaction. In the Maritimes, where the Queen would begin her Canadian tour that year, 60 per cent of those who replied registered a negative opinion of monarchy, compared to 37 per cent positive. (The poll did not refer to the Canadian monarchy or to the Queen specifically, but to the concept of monarchy.) A poll by Ipsos-Reid, also in June, found that two-in-three of those asked agreed the royal family should not have any formal role in Canadian society and reported growing sentiment that Elizabeth II should be Canada's last monarch. Fifty-eight per cent wanted Canada to end "ties" to the monarchy when Queen Elizabeth II's reign ends and 62 per cent believed that Canada's head of state should be the governor general, not the Queen.

A fifth poll, conducted by Harris-Decima for The Canadian Press a few days ahead of the Queen's nine-day tour in June, found that nearly half of respondents considered the monarchy to be "a relic of our colonial past that has no place in Canada today." The poll also found that 44 per cent of those asked wanted a national referendum to decide whether Canada should keep its monarchy. An Angus Reid poll run just after the Queen's tour found that 36% of responednts wanted Canada to remain a monarchy, 30 per cent preferred having an elected head of state, and 21 per cent felt it made no difference to them.

In May 2010, an online poll by Leger Marketing for QMI Agency found that a majority (59 per cent) of Canadians said that they had little or no interest in the Queen's visit to Canada, while 39 per cent had interest. The poll found that 32 per cent of people aged 18 to 34 had an attachment to the crown. Among those 65 and older, 46 per cent reported an attachment. One-fifth of Canadians said the Queen should stay home, and that furthermore, "Canada should sever its ties with the British Crown".

A poll conducted by Angus Reid in June 2011 found a decline in support for republicanism, with just 33 per cent of those who replied doing so in favour of abolishing the monarchy and 58 per cent supporting the country remaining a monarchy. When asked what words they would use to describe an upcoming royal tour, 44 per cent said "indifference", 34 per cent said "pride", 34 per cent said "enthusiasm", and 32 per cent said "joy", with the pollster noting that indifference was "largely driven by attitudes in Quebec". Elizabeth II, Prince William, and Catherine were, among those asked, the most popular members of the royal family and, if Prince William were to be made king, 23 per cent would view the monarchy more favourably and two per cent would view it more unfavourably.

A 2012 poll by Harris-Decima found that the respondents, as a whole, were "relatively evenly split" over whether the monarchy should remain or be abolished, but, those from English Canada demonstrated a "growing consensus" in favour of the Crown. Overall, the number of those who found the monarchy to be an "important part of Canadian history and political culture that ought to be maintained" rose by six per cent. A Forum poll from July the following year, taken immediately after the birth of Prince George, found that 48 per cent of respondents were opposed to abolishing the monarchy, with 37 per cent in favour, and 15 per cent undecided.

A Forum poll, taken in May 2015, immediately after the birth of Princess Charlotte, found that 39 per cent of respondents favoured "abolishing the monarchy upon the death of the Queen," while 45 per cent were opposed; 54 per cent opposed Prince Charles (now Charles III) succeeding his mother on the throne. According to Forum, 73 per cent of those asked "agree the head of state of Canada should be Canadian-born and live in Canada," an increase from 63 per cent who had the same view in 2013.

A poll conducted in August 2017 found that 41 per cent of respondents wanted to abolish the monarchy following the death or abdication of Elizabeth II, with 43 per cent in favour of maintaining the status quo. In February 2019, a poll by Research Co concluded 31 per cent of those who replied said Canada should remain a monarchy, while 33 per cent believed Canada should have an elected head of state.

=== 2020s ===
Research Co's 2020 poll found 32 per cent of respondents would have preferred for Canada to have an elected head of state, while 27 per cent would rather keep the monarchy. The proportion of those asked who said they did not care either way increased to 28 per cent. Another year after, Research Co ran a poll that found 45 per cent of people asked indicated a preference for Canada to have an elected head of state, while 24 per cent would rather keep the monarchy. The proportion who said they do not care either way dropped to 19 per cent.

In a poll conducted in February 2022 by Research Co, 49 per cent respondents claimed they would prefer for Canada to have an elected head of state, while 21 per cent would rather keep the monarchy. In addition, 34 per cent said they would like to see Prince William take over as king from Queen Elizabeth II, while only 17 per cent would rather have Prince Charles as monarch. Forty-eight per cent believed the country will “definitely” or “probably” be a monarchy two decades from now, while 30 per cent expected Canada to have an elected head of state by that time.

Angus Reid conducted in April 2022 an online poll of members of the Angus Reid Forum, which found 51 per cent of those who answered were agreeable toward the idea of Canada "severing ties with the British monarchy". Respondents of all ages were also less keen on Elizabeth's successor, Charles, becoming king, with 67 per cent saying they moderately or strongly opposed recognizing him as Canada's next head of state. Seventy-six per cent were against the idea of Charles' wife becoming Queen Camilla. But, nearly two-thirds of those polled still viewed Queen Elizabeth II favourably. Nanos Research's poll a month later, conducted primarily around the question of whether or not Queen Elizabeth II should apologize for the Church of England's role in the Canadian Indian residential school system, found that 48 per cent of those polled opposed "cutting ties with the British monarchy" and replacing the head of state with the prime minister, while 43 per cent supported the idea. In the same poll, when asked if Canada should "cut ties" with the monarchy and replace the head of state with a governor general appointed by "the government", 48 per cent of Canadians opposed the idea, while 42 per cent supported it. Support for both proposals was strongest in Quebec, while opposition to the former proposal was strongest in the Maritimes and opposition to the latter proposal was strongest in the prairies. When asked if it was a good time to open up constitutional discussions on "cutting ties" with the monarchy, 41 per cent of those who answered said they thought it was a poor time to do so, while 39 per cent thought it was a good time to open up discussions.

Research Co. took a poll in September 2022, finding more than a third of those questioned (36 per cent) said they would prefer for Canada to have an elected head of state, down 13 points since February. In contrast, just over three-in-ten (31 per cent; up 10 points) said they would like for Canada to remain a monarchy, while 24 per cent (up six points) did not care either way. Fifty two per cent stated they believe Canada will still be a monarchy in 20 years; 31 per cent said they think the country will have an elected head of state. The same company polled individuals again in March 2023, finding 19 per cent of those questioned said they would prefer for Canada to remain a monarchy, 44 per cent would prefer for Canada to have an elected head of state, and 22 per cent have no opinion.

A web survey conducted by Leger in March 2023 found 67 per cent of those polled felt indifferent toward the accession of King Charles III and 80 per cent had "no personal attachment" to the monarchy. Fifty-six per cent of respondents said it was time for Canada "to reconsider its ties with the monarchy", 44 per cent being against the idea.

A 2023 survey by Lord Ashcroft Polls found that 24 per cent of those questioned in Canada considered the institution of the monarchy to be favourable, with 41 per cent finding it unfavourable and 34 per cent neutral. The same poll recorded that 47 per cent would vote in a referendum for the country to become a republic, 23 per cent would vote for continuance of the monarchy, 22 per cent stated they did not know, and eight per cent would not vote. Brean argued this poll revealed that abolition of the Canadian monarchy is "always in Canada's future, never its present", pointing out how, when respondents were asked about the result of a hypothetical referendum 10 years ahead, 54 per cent said the republic side would win and 18 per cent said Canada would remain a constitutional monarchy. Yet, when asked how they would vote in the present, the republican impulse weakened, as 23 per cent said they would vote for Canada to stay as a monarchy and 47 per cent stated they would vote to abolish the Crown. When presented with the question of a referendum being held the next day, republicanism grew "weaker still, with 36 per cent answering they would vote to keep things as they are and 40 per cent saying they would vote for abolition. By Brean's analysis, the poll demonstrated Canadians view replacing the monarchy as a very low priority, pointing to the reaction to the statement, "in an ideal world we wouldn't have the monarchy in Canada, but there are more important things for the country to deal with": 79 per cent expressed agreement, including 85 per cent of those who said they would vote against the Crown.

A poll taken after the death of Queen Elizabeth found 54 per cent of those polled supported "sever[ing] ties" with the "British monarchy" and 58 per cent supported a national referendum on the question. The same poll found 55 per cent of respondents agree the country's constitutional monarchy helps define Canadian identity and ought to remain Canada's form of government, with six in ten agreeing Canada's "relationship with the monarchy" is useful as it helps to differentiate Canada from the United States. Still, 63 per cent supported the idea the King and royal family should have no formal function in Canadian society.

In May 2025, on the eve of King Charles III and Queen Camilla's visit to Canada, a poll released by Pollara Strategic Insights showed that Canadians' attitudes towards Charles III and the monarchy have warmed, with 45% of Canadians supporting the constitutional monarchy, while 39% favour a republic.

== See also ==
- Oath of Allegiance (Canada)
- Republicanism in Canada
- History of monarchy in Canada
- National symbols of Canada
- Annexation movements of Canada
- Citizens for a Canadian Republic
- Republicanism in Australia
- Republicanism in the United Kingdom
