= Republicanism in Canada =

Movement to end constitutional monarchy in Canada

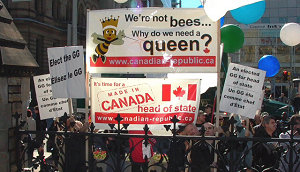
A demonstration on Parliament Hill by members of Citizens for a Canadian Republic during the installation ceremony of Governor General Michaëlle Jean, 2005

Republicanism in Canada or Canadian Republicanism is a movement for the replacement of the monarchy of Canada and a monarch as head of state with a parliamentary republic and a democratically selected Canadian as head of state. Republicans are driven by various factors, such as a perception of inequality in the concept of excluding all but members of the royal family from the position or the argument that Canadian independence will not be achieved until Canadians can choose their own head of state independently and democratically.

As with monarchism in Canada, strong republicanism is not a prevalent element of contemporary Canadian society. The movement's roots precede Canadian Confederation and it has emerged from time to time in Canadian politics, but has not been an influential force since the Rebellions of 1837, which some Canadian republicans consider their efforts to be a continuation of.

== National identity ==
Monarchy and inherited rights in government, symbolic or otherwise, is a concept incompatible with Canadian values of egalitarianism.

— Citizens for a Canadian Republic

Republicans in Canada assert that because of its hereditary aspects, the monarchy is inherently contrary to egalitarianism and multiculturalism. Further, though it diverges from both the official position of the Canadian government and the stated opinions of some judges, legal scholars, and members of the royal family themselves, republicans deem the King or Queen of Canada to be either a solely British or English individual representing a British institution foreign to Canada. Republicans assert that national pride is diminished by the monarchy, and it "prolongs a sense that Canada 'is a colony' and is 'subservient to Britain.'"

This questioning of the monarchy's role in Canadian identity arose as a part of wider cultural changes that followed the evolution of the British Empire into the Commonwealth of Nations, the rise of anti-establishmentism, the creation of multiculturalism as an official policy in Canada, and the blossoming of Quebec separatism; the latter becoming the major impetus of political controversy around the Crown. Quebec nationalists agitated for an independent Quebec republic and the monarchy was targeted as a symbol of anti-Anglophone demonstration, notably Quebecers turned their backs on her procession when she toured Quebec City that year. In a 1970 speech to the Empire Club of Canada, Governor General Roland Michener summed up the contemporary arguments against the Crown: From its opponents, he said, came the claims that monarchies are unfashionable, republics—other than those with oppressive regimes—offer more freedom, people are given greater dignity from choosing their head of state, the monarchy is foreign and incompatible with Canada's multicultural society, and that there should be change for the sake of change alone. This fits into the argument that the monarchy is not representative of the people of its countries. This has been argued to be the case with Canada having a head of state that is of a foreign nationality and living in another country.

It was later thought the Quiet Revolution and the period beyond should have inspired more republicanism amongst Canadians, but it did not. (Note: Even prominent calls for a republic, such as those issued by the Toronto Star editorial board in the centennial year of Confederation, did not inspire action amongst the wider populace. As put by Reg Whitaker: "In the 1960s, in the first fine, careless rapture of bilingualism and biculturalism, an end to the monarchy might have become a shared program between Quebec nationalists and Canadian dualists. It never happened.") Reg Whitaker blamed this on a combination of Quebec nationalists having no interest in the monarchy (as full sovereignty and their own form of government was their ultimate goal) with the remainder of the population simultaneously struggling with "bilingualism, dualism, special status, distinct society, asymmetrical federalism, sovereignty-association, partnership, and so on." The rise in multi-ethnic immigration to Canada in the 1970s did not inspire any significant desire to alter or remove the role of the Crown in Canada, the ethno-cultural groups not wanting to push constitutional change over a matter they had little concern for.

Instead, until the appointment of Stephen Harper as prime minister, successive governments made subtle efforts to diminish the stature of the Canadian monarchy—as David Smith said: "the historic Crown with its anthem, emblems, and symbolism made accessible a past the government of the day rejected"—though never, since the reaction to some of Prime Minister Pierre Trudeau's proposals for alterations to the monarchy and its role in Canada, publicly revealing their stances on the Crown. Following Elizabeth II's death in September 2022, Canadian Prime Minister Justin Trudeau publicly expressed support for the monarchy's continued status in Canada.

== Challenges with transitioning to a republic ==
Due to the unique political nature and structure of the Canadian state, there are significant cultural, legal, and constitutional challenges that must be addressed in order for Canada to become a republic. It has been described by political and constitutional law experts as "very difficult" and "virtually impossible" for Canada to remove the Monarch as head of state.

According to Part V, section 41, sub-section A of the Canadian Constitution Act 1982, any changes to the Monarch's position, including removal, require a constitutional amendment by unanimous consent. This would require the House of Commons, the Senate, and all 10 of the provincial legislatures to vote overwhelmingly for an amendment to remove or amend the role of the Canadian Monarch. Experts argue that this would require a vast amount of political capital to pass. Despite a somewhat large republican sentiment in the country, this capital does not presently exist and the issue is not viewed as a pressing concern; the leaders of the two largest parties, the Liberal Party and the Conservatives, were, as of 2024, publicly supportive of keeping the monarchy. For instance, a Bloc Québécois-led republican motion in the House of Commons in 2024 to remove the mention of the King in the parliamentary Oath was voted down and defeated. Both constitutional and political challenges would need to be overcome by a republican movement in order for Canada to remove the monarchy, and political and legal experts have stated they "don't see this happening anytime soon."

Another challenge that also often arises in discussion over the transition to a republic is the treaties and relations with the First Nations and other Indigenous peoples of Canada. Many treaties that have been signed with the indigenous people of Canada were done so between the Crown and Indigenous nations, not between the Canadian government and Indigenous peoples. This has been reflected in subsequent Supreme Court Rulings such as Haida Nation v. B.C. (Minister of Forests), 2004, which reinforced that any dealings by the Canadian government with Indigenous peoples pursuant to the treaties is done so in the name of the Crown. Most experts think consultation with Indigenous peoples on removing the Monarchy should take place prior to any plans for a transition to a republic.

Other challenges that are often raised in discussion of transitioning to a republic include the financial cost associated with removing the monarchy, including changing many Official Canadian National Symbols, which are widespread across public buildings, institutions, and documents such as passports, changing the appearance of the Canadian dollar, changing the names, insignia, uniforms and rank insignia of the Canadian Armed Forces and Police Forces, as well as the cost of establishing a new republican form of government, amongst others. While some of these costs could arguably be offset in part by the money that is currently spent on the running of the Monarchy in Canada, the Governor General, and Lieutenant Governors (estimated at $58.7 million per year or $1.55 per Canadian Taxpayer,) it is broadly accepted that there would still be a substantial financial cost that would have to be overcome in order to change from Monarchy to Republic.

== Democratic principles and governmental role ==
Canadian republicans view their country's monarchy as "outdated and irrelevant" and an undemocratic institution because the incumbent sovereign is neither elected, nor a citizen once on the throne; republicans will phrase this argument as "no Canadian citizen can become head of state."

In contrast to monarchist arguments, those against the Crown assert that it is possible to have an elected head of state be an apolitical individual and there would be no possibility of a clash with the prime minister over differences in political persuasion, though some republicans do desire an empowered chief executive who could hold the Cabinet in check for political reasons. Others feel an appointed Canadian president would be more democratic than the Crown. The range of often contradictory proposals highlights the fact that Canadian republicans are not fully united on what sort of republican form of government they believe the nation should adopt. The Westminster-style parliamentary republican model, which is advocated by other Commonwealth republican movements, has been embraced by Citizens for a Canadian Republic as the preferred model for Canada.

The truth is that the monarchy stands for much that has held Canada back. It embodies the triumph of inheritance over merit, of blood over brains, of mindless ritual over innovation. The monarchy reminds us to defer to authority and remember our place. In Quebec, the Royals are regarded as an insult.

— Margaret Wente, 2001

Towards that end, Citizens for a Canadian Republic proposed in March 2004 that the federal viceroy be made an elected position as a first step towards some form of republic. As the normal channels of appointment would follow after the election, no constitutional reform would be necessary. However, as monarchists point out, the scheme does not take into consideration any provincial input, especially concerning the relationship between the provincial and federal crowns and thus the lieutenant governors; an issue that would weigh heavily in any constitutional debate on the Crown, regardless of the selection process of the governor general. Further, a 2013 ruling by the Supreme Court of Canada disallowed similar consultative elections for senators, stating that such would be a change to how senators are selected and would thus require a constitutional amendment.

== History of issue ==
=== Colonial era and Confederation ===
Reformists began to emerge in the Canadian colonies during the early 19th century and by two decades into that century had begun to cohere into organized groups, such as the Upper Canada Central Political Union. The idea of political party was viewed by a number of British North Americans as an innovation of the United States, being "anti-British and of a republican tendency." Colonists were warned about "a few individuals, who unfortunately, are led by those, whose hostility to the British constitution is such, that they would sacrifice any and every thing to pull it down, in order that they might build up a Republic on its ruins." It was believed that the persons agitating for republican change and their supporters were of American origin and had been taught to admire republican government as the best in the world and ridicule monarchism.

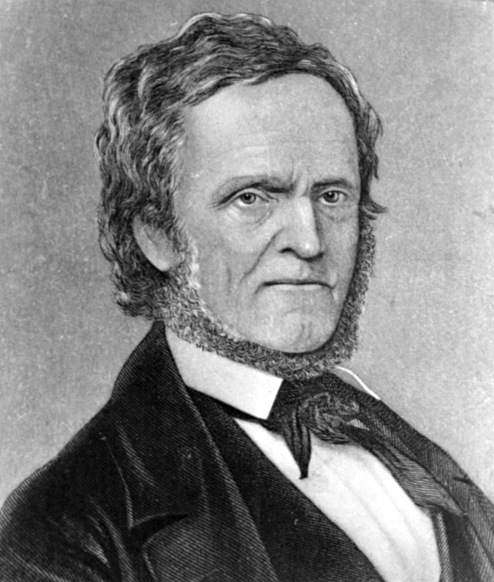
William Lyon Mackenzie, founder of the Republic of Canada, and later advocate of Canadian annexation into the United States

The first open uprisings in Canada against the monarchical system came in 1837, with the Lower Canada Rebellion—led by Louis Joseph Papineau and his Parti Patriote—and the Upper Canada Rebellion—led by William Lyon Mackenzie. Though their main motives were for more representative government in their respective colonies, Mackenzie was inspired by the American model and wished to establish the same in Canada. Papineau originally expressed loyalty to the Crown in his Ninety-Two Resolutions, but turned when the British parliament instead adopted the Earl Russell's Ten Resolutions, which ignored all 92 of the requests from the Parti Patriote. Most colonists, however, did not espouse a break with the Crown and the rebellions ultimately failed. Mackenzie fled Toronto with 200 supporters and established, with the help of American sympathizers, the short-lived and never recognized Republic of Canada on Navy Island, while Papineau and other insurgents fled to the United States and proclaimed the Republic of Lower Canada.

After living in the US in order to avoid arrest in Canada, Mackenzie eventually became dissatisfied with the American republican system and gave up plans for revolution in the British North American provinces, though he theorized, near the end of his life, on Canadian annexation into the United States, should enough people in the former country become disillusioned with responsible government. Similarly, by 1849, Papineau was advocating the absorption of the Province of Canada (formed in 1840) into the American republic to the south. He echoed a significant minority of conservatives in Upper Canada who critiqued Canada's imitation of the British parliamentary constitutional monarchy as both too democratic and too tyrannical, theorizing that it simultaneously destroyed the independence of the appointed governor and legislative council and further concentrated power in the Cabinet. Instead, these "republican conservatives" preferred the American federal-state system and the US constitution, seeing the American model of checks and balances as offering Canada a more fair and conservative form of democracy. They debated constitutional changes that included an elected governor, an elected legislative council, and a possible union with the US, within this republican framework.

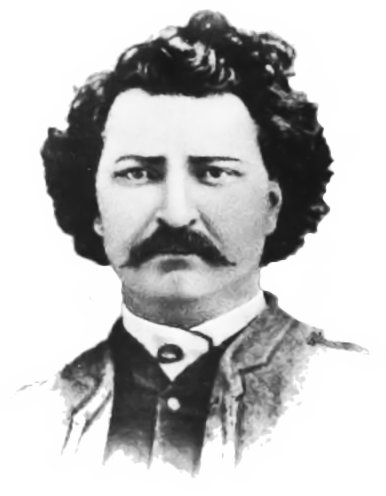
Louis Riel, President of the provisional government of Red River

Some decades later, in 1869, a rebellion in the Red River area of Rupert's Land erupted under the leadership of Louis Riel, who established in the Red River settlement a provisional government under John Bruce as president, with the intent of negotiating a provincial relationship with the federal government of Canada. As negotiations proceeded, Riel was eventually elected as president by the provisional government's council. His delegation to Ottawa was eventually successful in having the federal Crown-in-Council in 1870 found the province of Manitoba with the same parliamentary constitutional monarchy as existed in the other provinces.

=== Post-Quebec sovereignty movement ===
The Parti Québécois rose to power in Quebec on the support of nationalists, with views towards the monarchy that ranged from hostility to indifference. In February 1968, during a constitutional conference in Ottawa, delegates from the Union Nationale-governed Quebec indicated that a provincial president might suit the province better than the appointed viceroy. Two years later, Parti Québécois (PQ) members of the National Assembly refused to recite the constitutionally mandated Oath of Allegiance to the sovereign before taking their seats in the legislature. Sovereignists protested against the Queen's role in officially opening the 1976 Montreal Olympics, with René Lévesque asking Elizabeth to refuse the advice from Prime Minister Pierre Trudeau and not open the games. Republican options were discussed following the election of the sovereigntist Parti Québécois to government in Quebec, but only specifically in relation to the province.

Continuing talks of constitutional reform led to the role of the monarchy in Canada coming under scrutiny in the lead up to the patriation of the Canadian constitution in 1982. However, proposals for change were thwarted by the provinces, including Quebec.

The notion of a republic was raised publicly in the early 1990s, when Peter C. Newman wrote in Maclean's that the monarchy should be abolished in favour of a head of state "who would reflect our own, instead of imported, values." Then, in 1997, Deputy Prime Minister John Manley echoed Newman when he expressed at the end of a television interview his opinion that Canada should abolish its monarchy, citing Australia's contemporary discussions around the Australian Crown. Then, in December of the following year, the Prime Minister's press secretary, Peter Donolo, who also complained that the monarch made Canada appear as a "colonial outpost", unaccountably announced through a media story that the Prime Minister's Office was considering the abolition of the monarchy as a millennium project, though no definitive plans had been made. Donolo later supported Manley when, (Note: Donolo wrote in Maclean's that "it's the institution of the monarchy that is incompatible with the values of a modern, democratic, pluralistic state.") on Victoria Day 2001, Manley said on CBC Radio that he believed that hereditary succession was outdated, and that the country's head of state should be elected. Then, just prior to the Queen's pan-country tour to celebrate her Golden Jubilee the following year, Manley (at that point the designated minister in attendance for the sovereign's arrival in Ottawa) again stated his preference for a "wholly Canadian" institution to replace the present monarchy after the reign of Queen Elizabeth II; he was rebuked by other Cabinet members, a former prime minister, and the Leader of the Opposition, as well as a number of prominent journalists. (Note: Negative commentary came from John Fraser and Christie Blachford in the National Post, Rosie DiManno in the Toronto Star, Hartley Steward in The Sunday Sun, Michael Valpy in The Globe and Mail, Rex Murphy on the CBC, and Andrew Coyne in the National Post.)

In 2002, the group Citizens for a Canadian Republic was established to promote the abolition of the Canadian monarchy in favour of a republic, at approximately the same time The Globe and Mail newspaper began a campaign against the monarchy, with three republican journalists on staff – Margaret Wente, Jeffrey Simpson, and Lawrence Martin – though the editorial board argued Canada could dispose of its monarchy without becoming a republic. Tom Freda, chairman and co-founder of Citizens for a Canadian Republic, called for simply replacing the monarchy with the governor general, saying that he's not in favour of destroying Canada's identity or cultural institutions: "All we're advocating is that the link to the monarchy, in our Constitution, be severed. Our governor general for the past 60 years has performed all the duties of a head of state, and there's no reason we shouldn't make our governor general our official head of state." Freda also, however, called the governor general and lieutenant governors "redundant".

At approximately the same time, the editors of The Globe and Mail began calling for the governor general to be made head of state under the guise of "patriating the monarchy", and arguing that Canada could rid itself of its Crown without becoming a republic, and backing their journalist Jeffrey Simpson's preference for the Companions of the Order of Canada to choose the head of state in a Canadian republic.

Lawrence Martin called for Canada to become a republic in order to re-brand the nation and better its standings in the international market, he cited Sweden – a constitutional monarchy – as an example to be followed.

In 2007, Quebec sovereignty again collided with the monarchy, when Quebec separatists threatened to mount demonstrations should the Queen be in attendance at the ceremonies for the 400th anniversary of Quebec City; Mario Beaulieu, then vice-president of the Saint-Jean-Baptiste Society announced that the Queen's presence would be a catalyst for action, saying: "You can be sure that people will demonstrate in protest... We are celebrating the foundation of New France, not its conquest. The monarchy remains a symbol of imperialism and colonialism. Her presence will not be welcomed", and Gérald Larose, president of the Quebec Sovereignty Council, stated that the monarchy was "the most despicable, appalling, anti-democratic, imperial, colonial symbol against which all social and individuals rights were obtained through the course of history."

At the Liberal Party of Canada convention in January 2012, its members debated on a motion to include severing ties with the monarchy as a party platform. The proposed motion was rejected by 67%

On October 26, 2022, Bloc Québécois (BQ) Leader Yves-François Blanchet moved a motion calling for the severing of "ties between the Canadian State and the British monarchy" in the Federal House of Commons, It was rejected 44 to 266.

== Activities ==
As abolition of the monarchy would require a constitutional amendment made only after the achievement of unanimous consent amongst the federal parliament and all ten provincial legislatures, republicans face difficulty in achieving their goal. Further, though republicans have pointed to Ireland and India as models that could be adapted to Canada, no specific form of republic or selection method for a president has been decided on, and the Canadian populace remains largely indifferent to the issue.

Up until 2010, most republican action had taken the form of protests on Victoria Day – the Canadian sovereign's official birthday – in Toronto, lobbying of the federal and provincial governments to eliminate Canadian royal symbols, and legal action against the Crown, specifically in relation to the Oath of Citizenship and the Act of Settlement 1701.

Today, most of Citizens for a Canadian Republic's activities are educational, providing commentators to the media and networking with supporters in all political parties.

In 2013, several former members of Citizens for a Canadian Republic formed Republic Now, led by Ashok Charles, which has a more activist approach in advocating for a republic.

Ted McWhinney has argued that Canada can become a republic upon the demise of the current monarch by not proclaiming a successor; according to McWhinney, this would be a way for the constitution to evolve "more subtly and by indirection, through creating new glosses on the Law of the Constitution as written, without formally amending it." However, Ian Holloway, Dean of Law at the University of Western Ontario, criticized this proposal for its ignorance of provincial input, and opined that its implementation "would be contrary to the plain purpose of those who framed our system of government."

== Opinion polling ==
Polls conducted on the subject of abolition of the Canadian Crown in 2022 and 2023, following the accession of Charles III, stated that 58% of Canadians think there should be a referendum on the future of the monarchy and between 40% and 54% of Canadians favour becoming a republic. However, pollster Michael Ashcroft cautioned that, "for change to happen in Canada, the issue would have to find its way to the top of the political agenda. It’s hard to see what could be the catalyst for that to happen."

In 2025, on the eve of King Charles III and Queen Camilla's visit to Canada, a poll released by Pollara Strategic Insights showed that 45% of Canadians support retaining the monarchy, while 39% favour ending ties to the crown.

== See also ==
- Debate on the monarchy in Canada
- Monarchism in Canada
- Monarchism in the United States
- Republicanism in Antigua and Barbuda
- Republicanism in Australia
- Republicanism in the Bahamas
- Republicanism in Jamaica
- Republicanism in New Zealand
- Republicanism in the United Kingdom
- Scottish republicanism
- Welsh republicanism
- Constitutional monarchy
- Republicanism

== Sources ==
- Smith, David E. (1999). The Republican Option in Canada, Past and Present. Toronto: University of Toronto Press. ISBN 0-8020-4469-7.
