= Republicanism in Antigua and Barbuda =

Movement to turn Antigua and Barbuda into a republic

Republicanism in Antigua and Barbuda is a movement for the replacement of the constitutional monarchy of Antigua and Barbuda with a republican form of government.

== Background ==
Antigua and Barbuda became independent from the United Kingdom in 1981 and is currently one of 15 Commonwealth members that share the same individual as monarch and head of state. Its system of government is a parliamentary democracy under a constitutional monarchy.

== History ==
In 1994, the Prime Minister of Antigua and Barbuda Lester Bird reportedly stated to Fidel Castro that he contemplated moving Antigua and Barbuda towards becoming a republic. After Bird explained that the then-Queen did not interfere in the country's politics, Castro suggested that Antigua and Barbuda remain as it is, as the monarch may provide a confidence in the constitution.

Information Minister Melford Nicholas said in 2020 that Antigua and Barbuda was likely to consider becoming a republic in the future, but that the focus at the time was returning the economy to its state prior to the COVID-19 pandemic.

After Barbados became a republic in November 2021, Minister of Tourism Charles Fernandez called for the government of Antigua and Barbuda to do the same. The Chairman of the Antigua and Barbuda Reparations Support Commission, Dorbrene O’Marde, echoed Fernandez, but went on to say the move could include challenges. O'Marde suggested considering the Dominican Republic model. Political and social commentator Carlon Knight said that other structural matters should be tended to before Antigua and Barbuda became a republic.

During a royal tour by the Earl and Countess of Wessex in April 2022, the Prime Minister stated that Antigua and Barbuda would "one day become a republic", but the move was "not on the cards" at that time. In the same month, historian Ivor Ford suggested that most people in Antigua and Barbuda wanted to replace the Queen as head of state. He added that young people don't relate to the royal family and that the new head of state should be democratically elected.

In June, the government clarified its position by saying that becoming a republic was not a current priority.

In September 2022, following the death of Queen Elizabeth II, Prime Minister of Antigua and Barbuda Gaston Browne said he would call for a referendum on becoming a republic in the next term of government, within three years. He added, “This is not an act of hostility or any difference between Antigua and Barbuda and the monarchy, but it is the final step to complete that circle of independence, to ensure that we are truly a sovereign nation." He said that this would not mean losing commonwealth membership, and "I think most people haven't even bothered to think about it." Antigua and Barbuda was the first country to suggest a move towards becoming a republic after the death of Elizabeth II.

In the same month, Chief of staff to Browne Lionel Hurst said on the prospect of whether the country would want to take the step to becoming a republic, "We're not sure yet". If Gaston Browne were to win the 2023 Antiguan general election, the years before a referendum would include "selling the idea" to Antiguans and Barbudans.

In May 2023, following the coronation of King Charles III, the cabinet released a statement, “Despite their participation, the Head of Government reiterated his administration's determination to bring about a Republican form of Government, rather than continue ad infinitum the constitutional monarchy as now exists.” An update on a timeframe was not detailed. Browne also hoped to shift from the Judicial Committee of the Privy Council to the Caribbean Court of Justice.

In December 2025, Attorney General Sir Steadroy Benjamin announced in Parliament that the government intended to introduce a constitutional amendment to change the Oath of Allegiance, removing the requirement to pledge loyalty to the monarch (King Charles III, his heirs, and successors) and redirecting it toward the nation of Antigua and Barbuda itself. Benjamin described the existing oath as outdated and inconsistent with the country's sovereignty, achieved upon independence in 1981, emphasizing that it was "about time" to end allegiance to the Crown. The amendment passed the House of Representatives on 15 December 2025 and the Senate on 17 December. It did not require a referendum or waiting period under section 47(5) of the constitution and took effect on 1 January 2026.

In February 2026 an official constitutional reform committee commenced operations.

== Opinion polling ==
A 2023 Lord Ashcroft poll found that 47% of those surveyed favoured becoming a republic, with 45% preferring to keep the monarchy and 8% undecided.

== See also ==
- Monarchy of Antigua and Barbuda
- Republicanism in Australia
- Republicanism in the Bahamas
- Republicanism in Canada
- Republicanism in Jamaica
- Republicanism in New Zealand
- Republicanism in the United Kingdom
- Scottish republicanism
- Welsh republicanism
