= Republic of Lower Canada =

1838 unrecognized breakaway state

Republic of Lower Canada République du Bas-Canada
- 1838
- Flag

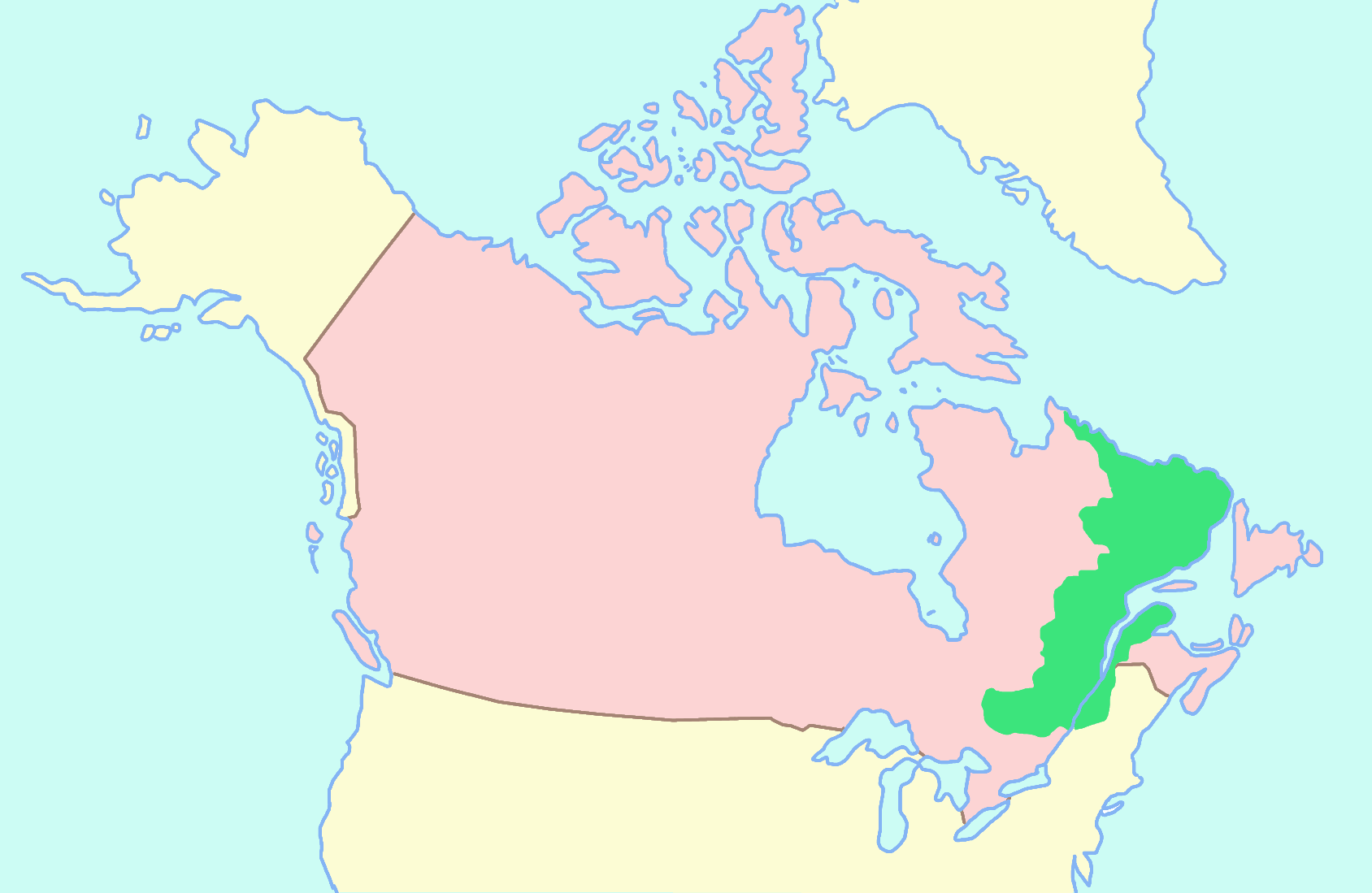
- Territories claimed by the Republic of Lower Canada Territory of present-day Canada
- Status: Unrecognized
- Capital: Napierville
- Common languages: French, English
- Government: Republic
- President
  - 1838: Robert Nelson
- Legislature: Representative Democracy
- Historical era: Lower Canada Rebellions
  - Declaration of Independence: 22 February 1838
  - Battle of Odelltown: 9 November 1838
Preceded by	Succeeded by
Lower Canada	Province of Canada
- Today part of: Quebec; Newfoundland and Labrador

The Republic of Lower Canada was a break-away state proclaimed in the aftermath of the Rebellions of 1837–1838. The defeat of the rebellion meant that the state could never be properly established.

== History ==
=== Origins ===
A British colony since 1763, Canada was divided into two distinct entities in 1791: Lower Canada, mainly inhabited by the descendants of the colonists of New France, and Upper Canada, mainly inhabited by colonists from Great Britain, Ireland, and the United States. Lower and Upper Canada were frequently in tension with each other, which made governing difficult.

=== Declaration of independence and 1838 invasions ===
Robert Nelson declared himself the president of the republic and read the Declaration of Independence of Lower Canada in front of thousands of people cheering him along in Napierville.

== See also ==
- Patriote movement
- Republicanism in Canada
- Republic of Upper Canada
- Executions at the Pied-du-Courant Prison
- History of Quebec
