= Lower Canada =

1791–1841 British colony in North America

Coordinates: 50°N 69°W

Province of Lower Canada Province du Bas-Canada (French)
- 1791–1841
- Union Flag (1801 version) Seal
- Anthem: "God Save the King/Queen"
- Status: British colony
- Capital: Quebec City
- Common languages: French, English
- Government: Château Clique oligarchy
- Sovereign
  - 1791–1820: George III
  - 1820–1830: George IV
  - 1830–1837: William IV
  - 1837–1841: Victoria
- Lieutenant-Governor and Executive Council of Lower Canada
- Legislature: Parliament of Lower Canada
  - Upper house: Legislative Council
  - Lower house: Legislative Assembly
- Historical era: British Era
  - Constitutional Act of 1791: 26 December 1791
  - Act of Union 1840: 10 February 1841

Area
- 1839: 534,185 km^{2} (206,250 sq mi)

Population
  - 1839: c. 700,000
- Currency: Canadian pound
Preceded by
Province of Quebec (1763–1791)
Succeeded by
Province of Canada
Newfoundland Colony
United States
- Today part of: Canada; Quebec; Newfoundland and Labrador; United States; New Hampshire

The Province of Lower Canada (French: province du Bas-Canada) was a British colony on the lower Saint Lawrence River and the shores of the Gulf of Saint Lawrence established in 1791 and abolished in 1841. It covered the southern portion of the current Province of Quebec and the Labrador region of the current Province of Newfoundland and Labrador (until the Labrador region was transferred to Newfoundland in 1809).

Lower Canada consisted of part of the former colony of Canada of New France, conquered by Great Britain in the Seven Years' War ending in 1763 (also called the French and Indian War in the United States). Other parts of New France conquered by Britain became the Colonies of Nova Scotia, New Brunswick, and Prince Edward Island.

The Province of Lower Canada was created by the Constitutional Act 1791 from the partition of the British colony of the Province of Quebec (1763–1791) into the Province of Lower Canada and the Province of Upper Canada. The prefix "lower" in its name refers to its geographic position farther downriver from the headwaters of the St. Lawrence River than its contemporary Upper Canada, present-day southern Ontario.

Lower Canada was abolished in 1841 when it and adjacent Upper Canada were united into the Province of Canada.

== History ==
=== Establishment ===
Before Lower Canada, there was the Province of Quebec. The Province of Quebec was established from conquered French lands from the French and Indian War. The Quebec Act officially set up governance in those lands and incorporated French elements into the province's government. The Province of Quebec was split in 1791 by the Constitutional Act 1791 into Lower Canada and Upper Canada. The Constitutional Act placed English Law in Upper Canada, and French Law and institutions in Lower Canada. Catholics were also granted the ability to freely practise.

=== Transition into the British Empire ===
Society in New France was deeply dependent on nobles, clergy, and the military. After the British conquest, British aristocrats and military personnel replaced their French equivalents. A conflict arose between the British aristocrats and the French-Canadian middle class, which was worsened by the introduction of parliamentarianism. By the end of the 18th century, the nobility's power was totally dependent on the colonial government. These problems came to a head when the British merchants wanted to build canals on the St. Lawrence River to help with navigation across the river. The French nationalists held a majority in the legislative assembly and refused to allow the construction. This led to feelings of vulnerability in Lower Canada amongst British aristocracy.

Anglophone aristocrats often sought the support of the governor, colonial bureaucrats, or the government in London mostly because they could never form a majority in the legislative assembly. Their political defeats led them to defend their colonial ties to Britain and support conservative ideas. At the turn of the century the Anglophones began to control more and more the economic activity in Lower Canada, which lead to the French-Canadians viewing them as a threat.

=== Political tensions ===
The tensions between Anglophone aristocrats and the French-Canadian middle class culminated in the formation of the Parti canadien, the first Canadian political party. The party advocated for the independence of the legislature from the Lieutenant-Governor and fought plans to unify Upper Canada and Lower Canada.

In 1810, the Governor James Henry Craig had editors of the Parti canadien's newspaper arrested to suppress them before dissolving the legislature. Louis-Joseph Papineau, leader of the party, decided then to focus on more limited results and to stray away from being views as an extremist party. He gained the support of Irish Catholics in Lower Canada which also gave him the support of the clergy.

In 1827, after pressure from militant groups, Papineau became more radical and began to turn towards the idea of independence. Taking from the ideas of the American government, all positions that held power then became elected positions. This nationalism gave the Parti canadien support amongst French-Canadians but almost completely lost them the support of Anglophones in Lower Canada.

The clergy in Lower Canada were also very unhappy with the political situation at the time and wanted their old privileges restored. They wanted the ability to educate in Lower Canada and were briefly granted that ability in 1824, with the passage of Parish Schools Act. In 1829, the Parti canadien established assembly schools, which removed the Catholic Church from education, creating another political divide.

=== Rebellion ===
The three divides in Lower Canada ultimately reached a breaking point. To combat this the British government adopted the Russell Resolutions, which rejected the 92 Resolutions created by the Parti canadien. After the Patriote Rebellion in the Rebellions of 1837–1838 was suppressed by government troops and Loyal volunteers, the 1791 Constitution was suspended on 27 March 1838 and a special council was appointed to administer the colony. An abortive attempt by revolutionary Robert Nelson to declare a Republic of Lower Canada was quickly thwarted.

The provinces of Lower Canada and Upper Canada were combined as the United Province of Canada in 1841, when the Act of Union 1840 came into force. Their separate legislatures were combined into a single parliament with equal representation for both constituent parts, even though Lower Canada had a greater population.

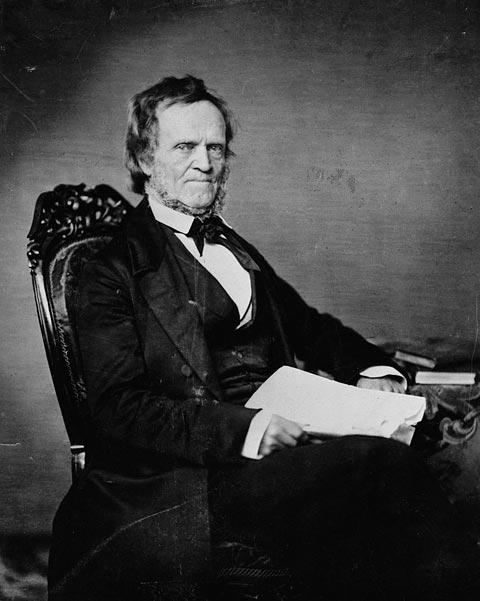
William Lyon Mackenzie, rebellion chief in Upper Canada

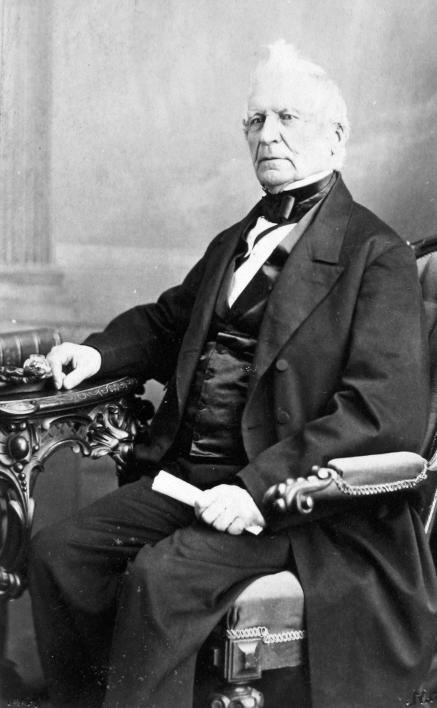
Louis-Joseph Papineau, rebellion chief in Lower Canada

== Constitution ==
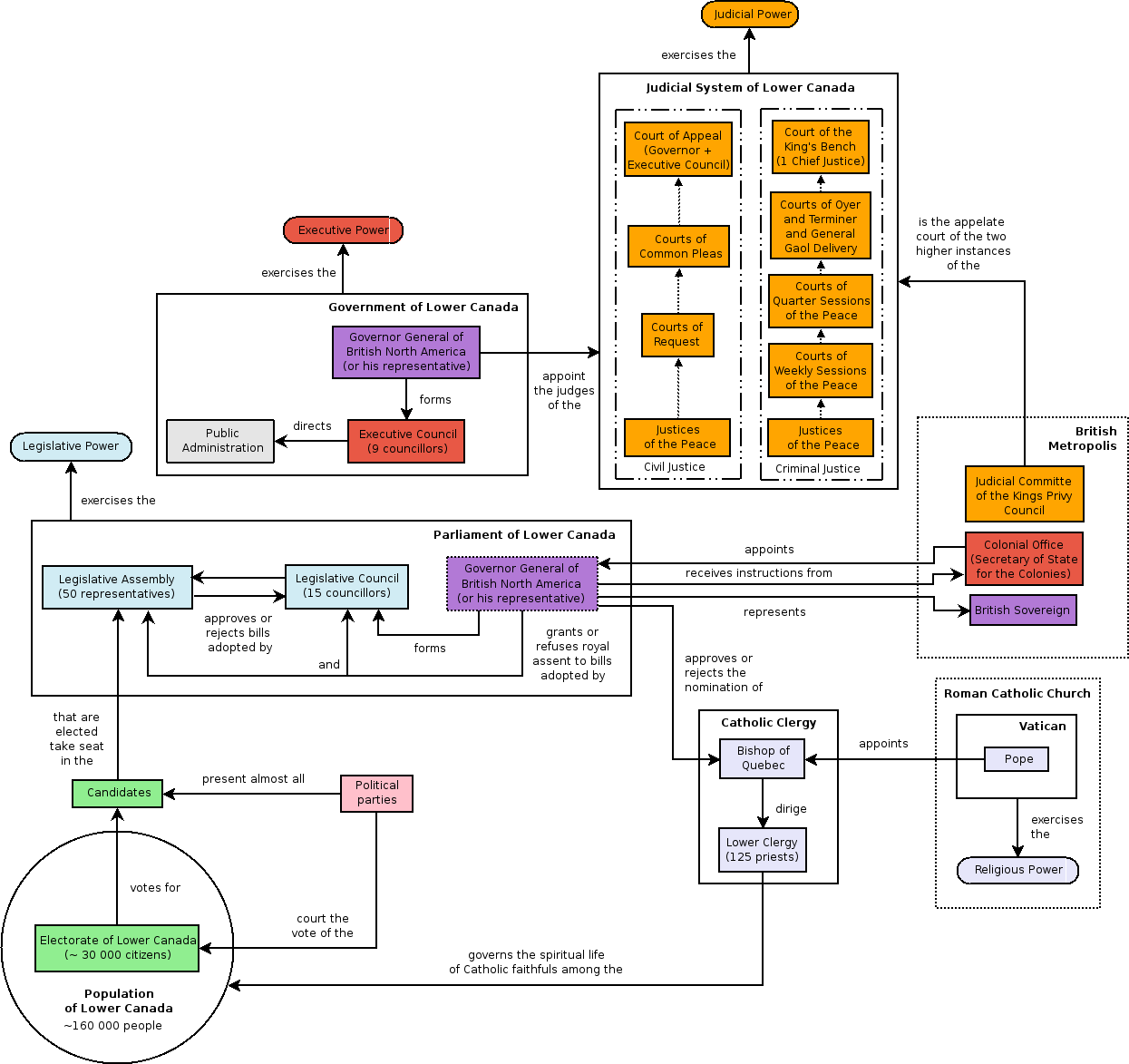
Constitution of Lower Canada in 1791

The Province of Lower Canada inherited the mixed set of French and English institutions that existed in the Province of Quebec during the 1763–1791 period and which continued to exist later in Canada-East (1841–1867) and ultimately in the current Province of Quebec (since 1867).

== Population ==
Lower Canada was populated mainly by Canadiens, an ethnic group who trace their ancestry to French colonists who settled in Canada from the 17th century onward.

Population of Lower Canada, 1806 to 1841
Year	Census estimate
1806	250,000
1814	335,000
1822	427,465
1825	479,288
1827	473,475
1831	553,134
1841	650,000

== Transportation ==
Current route marker seen along the Chemin

Travelling around Lower Canada was mainly by water along the St. Lawrence River. On land, the only long-distance route was the Chemin du Roy, or King's Highway; it was built in the 1730s by New France. The King's Highway was, in addition to the mail route, the primary means of long-distance passenger travel until steamboats (1815) and railways (1850s) began to challenge the royal road. The royal road's importance waned after the 1850s and would not re-emerge as a key means of transportation until the highway system of Quebec was created in the 20th century.

== See also ==
- Canada East, period after the Act of Union 1840
- Former colonies and territories in Canada
- French and Indian War
- French and Indian Wars
- French colonial empire
- List of lieutenant governors of Quebec
- National Patriots' Day
- Ottawa River timber trade
- Province of Quebec (1763–1791)
- Rebellion
- Republic of Lower Canada
- The Canadas
- Timeline of Quebec history
- Upper Canada
