= Republicanism in the Bahamas =

Movement to make the Bahamas a republic

Republicanism in the Bahamas is a political movement for the replacement of the monarchy of the Bahamas with a president as head of state. The idea has been floated since at least 2002, with renewed discussions following Barbados' transition to a republic in 2021, and the death of Queen Elizabeth II in 2022.

== Background ==
The Bahamas gained independence from the United Kingdom on 10 July 1973, as a constitutional monarchy with parliamentary democracy within the Commonwealth of Nations, with Queen Elizabeth II as head of state. The Bahamian monarch, currently King Charles III, is represented in the country by the governor-general of the Bahamas, while the prime minister serves as head of government.

It was reported that Barbados becoming a republic in 2021 encouraged republican movements elsewhere in the Caribbean, including the Bahamas. Arley Gill, Grenada’s ambassador to the Caribbean Community, suggested in 2022 that a momentum for republicanism had developed across the Caribbean.

== History ==
=== Commissions ===
In 2002, the government of the Bahamas appointed a Constitutional Review Commission, which asked for public opinion, including keeping the Bahamian monarch as head of state. Its preliminary report concluded there were "mixed feelings" on the matter and “the abolition of the English monarch [sic] as head of state of the Bahamas is part of the evolutionary process toward a true peoples' government [sic]”. A commission in 2012 recommended maintaining the status quo, but, postulated that a republic would be the "inevitable terminus of constitutional evolution". The following year, a commission recommended the government begin a process of public education to prepare citizens for a republican form of government in the future. No government has yet followed that advice.

=== Discussion and proposals ===
In January 2020, Minister of Education Jeffrey Lloyd said that the Bahamas should have a discussion on becoming a republic.

In September 2020, former Attorney General Sean McWeeney, Q.C. said that the Bahamas becoming a republic is an inevitable part of the political evolution of the country and would likely need to be driven by the Bahamian government.

In December 2021, the Office of the Prime Minister Press Secretary Clint Watson said that a transition to republic was not currently on the agenda of the Davis administration. In the same month the former Director of Culture Dr. Nicolette Bethel suggested that a federal republic would be the best system of government for the Bahamas. Also in December 2021, Sarah Dickson, British high commissioner to the Bahamas said that the future of the head of state of the Bahamas was up to the Bahamian people and that the UK and the Royal Family would continue to be friends of the country, working closely on a variety of matters, regardless.

In March 2022, Renward Wells suggested that the Bahamas was ready to become a republic with former Progressive Liberal Party (MP) Leslie Miller suggesting it would not happen in his lifetime. On a royal tour to the region, Prince William said that the royal family would "support with pride and respect your decisions about your future".

In September 2022, following the death of Elizabeth II, Prime Minister of the Bahamas, Philip Davis said that he requires the support of the public of the Bahamas before proceeding with the process, “The only challenge with us moving to a republic is that I can’t, as much as I would wish to do it, I cannot do it without your consent". He added, "I will have a referendum and the Bahamian people will have to say to me, 'yes'."

== Model ==
The Coalition of Independents has suggested the Bahamas use a similar model to the United States of America; though, the organization believes becoming a republic will mean independence for the Bahamas, which the country attained in 1973.

== Polling ==
A Lord Ashcroft poll conducted in 2023 found that 51% of respondents preferred becoming a republic, with 27% favouring continuance of the monarchy and 22% undecided or unwilling to choose.

== See also ==
- Monarchy of the Bahamas
- Republicanism in Antigua and Barbuda
- Republicanism in Australia
- Republicanism in Canada
- Republicanism in Jamaica
- Republicanism in New Zealand
- Republicanism in the United Kingdom
