= Citizens for a Canadian Republic =

Canadian advocacy group

- Founded: 2002
- Purpose: Canadian republicanism
- Location: Toronto, Ontario
- Region served: Canada
- Key people: Tom Freda, National Director; Pierre L. J. Vincent, Associate Director; Jamie Bradley, Associate Director
- Website: www.canadian-republic.ca

Citizens for a Canadian Republic (French: Citoyens pour une république canadienne) (CCR) is a Canadian advocacy group founded in 2002 that advocates for the replacement of the Canadian monarchy. The new head of state could either be chosen directly through a general election, indirectly by the Parliament of Canada, the legislative assemblies of Canadian provinces and territories, or some other electoral body.

CCR favours the retention of the Westminster-style parliament, with the prime minister as head of government, in a parliamentary republic similar to Ireland or India. It does not endorse any particular selection process, other than it should be democratic. The organization's general objective is "to promote replacing the British monarch as our head of state with a resident, democratically-selected Canadian."

== History ==
=== Founding ===
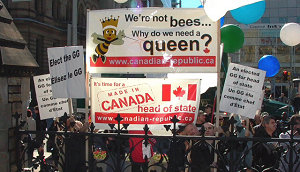
October 1, 2005. During the swearing-in ceremony of Governor General Michaëlle Jean on Parliament Hill, the Ottawa chapter of Citizens for a Canadian Republic demonstrated for the office to be elected and severed from the monarchy.

Citizens for a Canadian Republic was formed in 2002 "in an effort to provide balance in the debate over whether or not Canada should remain a constitutional monarchy" and to advocate for the "Canadianization" of the head of state. It remains the only formal organization devoted to the establishment of a Canadian republic.

=== O'Donohue v. Canada ===
That same year, CCR became involved in O'Donohue v. Canada, a lawsuit filed by one of its members, Tony O'Donohue. This suit challenged the constitutionality of certain provisions of the Act of Settlement, 1701, one of the laws governing succession to the Canadian throne, which disallows the sovereign from either being or being married to a Roman Catholic. O'Donohue argued that it thus violates the Canadian Charter of Rights and Freedoms. The case was dismissed in 2003, a ruling that was upheld in 2005, part of the rationale behind the decision being that, as the Act of Settlement is a constitutional document on equal-footing with the Charter, it could not be pre-empted by the Charter.

=== Oath of Allegiance ===
The co-founder of CCR, Pierre L. J. Vincent, became a republican activist in 1998 when he objected to taking the Oath of Allegiance, then required by law for all Canadian public servants beginning employment within the Civil Service. His refusal, partly based on his Acadian ancestry, sparked a publicized three-year legal battle involving the Government of Canada's Public Service Commission.

In 2001, the commission ruled that he could keep his job, a legal precedent that was later applied to a similar oath refusal. Both cases are recognized as being a major impetus for the 2003 Public Service Modernization Act, which ended the requirement for Government of Canada civil servants to swear an oath to the Queen as of December 31, 2005.

In 2007, former CCR member Charles Roach filed suit in opposition to the requirement of new citizens to swear an oath to the Queen. The case was on May 17, 2007, allowed to proceed, but has since been dismissed by the Ontario Superior Court of Justice.

== Organization and structure ==
CCR's national director and principal anglophone spokesperson is Tom Freda. Associate director and principal francophone and Western Canada spokesperson is Pierre L. J. Vincent. Associate Director Jamie Bradley is the principal Atlantic Canada spokesperson. Other prominent members of the group's Advisory Committee include Christopher Moore and Brigadier-General James S. Cox.

== See also ==
- Republicanism
- Republicanism in Canada
- Debate on the monarchy in Canada
- Monarchist League of Canada
