= Ted McWhinney =

Canadian politician and lawyer

Ted McWhinney QC

Member of Parliament for Vancouver Quadra
- In office October 25, 1993 – November 26, 2000
- Preceded by: John Turner
- Succeeded by: Stephen Owen

Personal details
- Born: Edward Watson McWhinney; May 19, 1924 Lismore, New South Wales, Australia
- Died: May 19, 2015 (aged 91) Vancouver, British Columbia, Canada
- Party: Liberal

Edward Watson McWhinney QC (May 19, 1924 – May 19, 2015) was a Canadian lawyer and academic specializing in constitutional and international law. He was a Liberal Party Member of Parliament from 1993 to 2000 for the electoral district of Vancouver Quadra.

== Life and career ==
Born in Lismore, New South Wales, Australia, McWhinney, received his secondary education at North Sydney Boys High School, which he followed by study at the University of Sydney, becoming President of the Sydney University Liberal Club and Student Representative Council. McWhinney was a professor emeritus at Simon Fraser University and an expert on the Canadian Constitution who was often called upon to advise the Canadian government. He reportedly advised successive Canadian prime ministers since John Diefenbaker, as well as several governors general.

He held professorships at Yale, the Sorbonne, Toronto, McGill, Indiana, the Collège de France, and at the Meiji University in Tokyo. He was a legal consultant to the United Nations; constitutional adviser to the Premier of Ontario and to the Premier of Quebec; chief adviser to the Canadian government's Task Force on National Unity (the Pepin-Robarts Commission); Royal Commissioner of Enquiry to the Government of Quebec; Special Commissioner of Enquiry for the Government of British Columbia; special adviser to the Canadian delegation to the United Nations General Assembly, as well as constitutional and international law adviser to a number of foreign governments.

The author of 24 books (two of them in French and one in German), editor of 11 symposium volumes, and author of several hundred scientific articles, he was the first jurist from Canada to be elected to the century-old Institut de Droit International. He was a member of the Permanent Court of Arbitration in The Hague and was a member of the Institut Grand-Ducal of Luxembourg, and of the Académie Internationale de Droit Comparé in Paris. He died on May 19, 2015.

== Legal theory ==
In 2005, in anticipation of the publication of his book, The Governor General and the Prime Ministers, Canadian media sources reported that McWhinney, a professor of constitutional law and former Member of Parliament, had suggested that a future government of Canada could begin a process of phasing out the monarchy after the eventual demise of Elizabeth II "quietly and without fanfare by simply failing legally to proclaim any successor to the Queen in relation to Canada". This would, he claimed, be a way of bypassing the need for a constitutional amendment that would require unanimous consent by the federal parliament and all the provincial legislatures. However, Ian Holloway, Dean of Law at the University of Western Ontario, criticised McWhinney's proposal for its ignorance of provincial input and opined that its implementation "would be contrary to the plain purpose of those who framed our system of government."
