= Peter Donolo =

Peter Donolo (born October 1959) is a Canadian communications and political strategist. From 1993 to 1999, he was the director of communications in the office of Prime Minister Jean Chrétien - the longest tenure of any prime ministerial communications director in Canadian history..

He previously served as communications advisor to Toronto mayor Art Eggleton (1989–91) and as director of communications in the Office of the Leader of the Opposition under Chrétien from 1991 to 1993. Donolo was in charge of communications for the Liberals’ successful 1993 election campaign, a role he repeated in their re-election in 1997. From 1999 to 2001, he served as Canada's consul general in Milan, Italy. In 2001, he served as senior vice-president of public affairs at Air Canada.

Donolo is a well-known republican who has commented publicly about ending the monarchy of Canada. In a comment in the October 21, 2002, cover story of Maclean's, he referred to Canada as "behaving like a colonial outpost", and claiming the Queen of Canada is a foreigner.

From 2002 to 2009, Donolo was executive vice president and partner at The Strategic Counsel, a Toronto-based public opinion research and communications consulting firm.

From 2009 to 2011, Donolo was chief of staff to former Liberal Party of Canada leader Michael Ignatieff.

From 2012 to 2013, Donolo served as senior vice president, public affairs of the 2015 Pan American Games, held in Toronto.

From 2014 to 2016, he was special advisor for communications and intergovernmental affairs to the Government of the Province of Ontario, operating in the central Cabinet Office of the provincial government.

From 2016 to 2022, Donolo served as vice chair of Hill+Knowlton Strategies Canada.

In 2003, Donolo co-chaired the successful Toronto mayoral campaign of David Miller. He has remained politically active as a senior advisor in recent elections, in debate preparation for Justin Trudeau in the 2015 federal campaign, and running communications for Premier Kathleen Wynne's successful 2014 Ontario campaign.

Donolo is vice chair of the board of directors of Journalists for Human Rights (JHR) and is vice chair of the board of directors of the Canadian International Council (CIC). He is also a member of the boards of directors of PEN Canada and Transparency International Canada. He is a past director of Pathways to Education Canada, G(irls) 20, CIVIX, the Canadian Journalism Foundation, the Toronto Board of Trade and the Italian Chamber of Commerce of Ontario.

== Personal life ==
He is married to Mary Cruden and they have three children; Annie, Maggie and Michael.
