= Section 10 of the Constitution Act, 1867 =

Provision of the Constitution of Canada

British North America Act, 1867

Section 10 of the Constitution Act, 1867 (French: article 10 de la Loi constitutionnelle de 1867) is a provision of the Constitution of Canada relating to the powers of the Governor General of Canada and authorising an administrator to act on behalf of the governor general.

The Constitution Act, 1867 is the constitutional statute which established Canada. Originally named the British North America Act, 1867, the Act continues to be the foundational statute for the Constitution of Canada, although it has been amended many times since 1867. It is now recognised as part of the supreme law of Canada.

== Constitution Act, 1867 ==
The Constitution Act, 1867 is part of the Constitution of Canada and thus part of the supreme law of Canada. The Act sets out the constitutional framework of Canada, including the structure of the federal government and the powers of the federal government and the provinces. It was the product of extensive negotiations between the provinces of British North America at the Charlottetown Conference in 1864, the Quebec Conference in 1864, and the London Conference in 1866. Those conferences were followed by consultations with the British government in 1867. The Act was then enacted in 1867 by the British Parliament under the name the British North America Act, 1867. In 1982 the Act was brought under full Canadian control through the Patriation of the Constitution, and was renamed the Constitution Act, 1867. Since Patriation, the Act can only be amended in Canada, under the amending formula set out in the Constitution Act, 1982.

== Text of section 10 ==
Section 10 reads:

Application of Provisions referring to governor general
10 The Provisions of this Act referring to the Governor General extend and apply to the Governor General for the Time being of Canada, or other the Chief Executive Officer or Administrator for the Time being carrying on the Government of Canada on behalf and in the Name of the Queen, by whatever Title he is designated.

Section 10 is found in Part III of the Constitution Act, 1867, dealing with the federal executive power. It has not been amended since the Act was enacted in 1867.

== Legislative history ==
=== Governor General ===
There was no provision in either the Quebec Resolutions or the London Resolutions to define the office of governor general. Instead, Resolution 4 of the Quebec Resolutions provided that the executive power would be vested in the British sovereign, to be administered by "the Representative of the Sovereign duly authorized". Resolution 4 of the London Resolutions repeated this provision. However, the terms the "Governor General" and "Governor" are regularly used in both sets of Resolutions, outlining the powers of the office.

What became section 10 evolved through the drafts of the bill. The first rough draft of the bill, like the Resolutions, simply referred to the governor general at various points, outlining the powers of the office, but without any attempt to define the office. The next draft provided that there would be a governor general, appointed by the monarch. It was not until the third draft that a version similar to what became section 10 was included, as part of the definitions at the beginning of the bill, and then continued in that form in the fourth draft. The provision took final form as a section specifically about the governor general in the bill introduced in Parliament.

=== Administrator ===
There was no provision for an administrator in either the Quebec Resolutions or the London Resolutions. The position of an administrator was first mentioned in the rough draft of the British North America bill, in the proposed interpretation clause. The provision was continued in the interpretation clauses of the third and fourth drafts, and took final form in the bill introduced in Parliament.

== Purpose and interpretation ==
=== Governor General ===
The Constitution Act, 1867 does not actually create the position of governor general. Section 10 simply provides that there shall be a governor general, but does not define the position, its duties, or term of office. This approach was based on the British colonial law in the 19th century, where the governors of British colonies were appointed by the monarch under the royal prerogative, by a commission of office or by letters patent. The structure of the position was set out in the commission or letters patent, and could be modified each time a new governor was appointed. This practice was followed with the position of governor general, with each new incumbent receiving a commission with instructions. The commission and instructions were prepared by the British government.

The situation changed in 1947. At that time, the federal government of Prime Minister Mackenzie King determined that the position would be defined by letters patent issued by the monarch on the advice of the Canadian government, and would not be re-issued for each governor general on taking office. Instead, King George VI, on the advice of the Canadian government, issued the Letters Patent Constituting the Office of Governor General and Commander-in-Chief of Canada, which constitutes the office and sets out the powers and authorities of the governor general.

=== Administrator ===
Like the position of governor general, the position of administrator is not created by the Constitution Act, 1867 itself. Section 10 refers to the position, but does not define it. The position is now defined by paragraph VIII of the Letters Patent, which provides that in the case of the death, incapacity, removal, or absence of the Governor General from Canada, the Chief Justice of Canada shall act as the administrator.

The position of an administrator was well established in pre-Confederation British North America. The governor of a province, as head of the government, had to have someone who could act for him if he was out of the province, away from the seat of government, indisposed due to illness, or in extreme cases, had died in office.

The death of Lord Sydenham, the Governor General of the Province of Canada in 1841, was an example of a deputy, and then an administrator, exercising the duties of the position, which would have been well-known to the Fathers of Confederation. Sydenham was badly injured in a riding accident and developed tetanus. The Parliament was sitting, but its session was nearing completion. Sydenham appointed the commander of the local British military forces, General John Clitherow, as his deputy. In that capacity, Clitherow granted royal assent to the bills which had been passed in the parliamentary session, and then prorogued Parliament. Sydenham died the next day. The commander-in-chief of all the British forces in British North America, Sir Richard Downes Jackson, then acted as administrator, from September 24, 1841 to January 12, 1842, when the new governor general, Sir Charles Bagot, took office.

== Related provisions of the Constitution Act, 1867 ==
Section 14 of the Act provides for the appointment of deputies of the governor general.
