= Section 10 =

Section 10 may refer to:

- Section 10 of the Canadian Charter of Rights and Freedoms
- Section 10 of the Constitution Act, 1867
- Section 10 of the Constitution of Australia
- Section 10 of the Human Rights Act 1998
- Section 10 of the Indian Penal Code
- Section X, 2005 album by Beyond Twilight
