= Chief Justice of Canada =

Presiding judge of the Supreme Court of Canada

- Juge en Chef du Canada
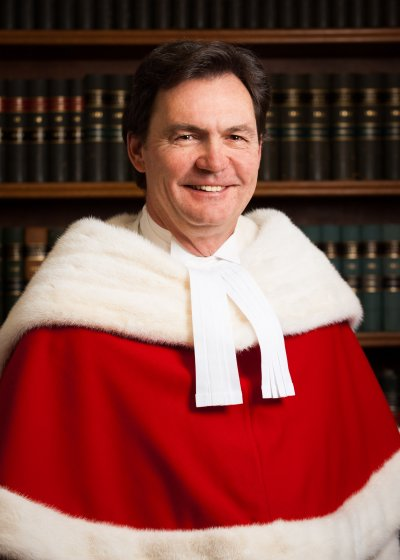
- Incumbent; Richard Wagner since December 18, 2017
- Supreme Court of Canada; Canadian judicial system (King-on-the-Bench)
- Style: The Right Honourable; Madam/Mister Chief Justice
- Status: Chief justice, head of a court system Deputy Governor General; 4th in Canadian order of precedence
- Member of: Supreme Court; Canadian Judicial Council (Ex-officio chairman); Order of Canada advisory council (chairman)
- Seat: Supreme Court Building, Ottawa, Ontario
- Nominator: Cabinet
- Appointer: The governor general; on the advice of the prime minister
- Term length: None; mandatory retirement at age 75
- Constituting instrument: Supreme Court Act
- Inaugural holder: Sir William Buell Richards
- Formation: September 30, 1875 (150 years ago)
- Succession: May assume viceregal role as Administrator of Canada
- Salary: $510,100 (as of April 2024)
- Website: scc-csc.gc.ca

The chief justice of Canada (French: juge en chef du Canada) is the presiding judge of the nine-member Supreme Court of Canada, the highest judicial body in Canada. As such, the chief justice is the highest-ranking judge of the Canadian court system. The Supreme Court Act provides that the chief justice is appointed by the Governor-in-Council, meaning the Governor General acting on the advice of the federal Cabinet. The chief justice serves until they resign, turn 75 years old, die, or are removed from office for cause. By tradition, a new chief justice is chosen from among the court's puisne justices.

The chief justice has significant influence in the procedural rules of the Court, presides when oral arguments are held, and leads the discussion of cases among the justices. The chief justice is also deputy governor general, ex-officio chairman of the Canadian Judicial Council, and heads the committee that selects recipients of the Order of Canada. Additionally, a chief justice also assumes the role of Administrator of Canada and exercises the viceregal duties of the governor general upon the death, resignation or incapacitation of the governor general.

Richard Wagner has served as the current chief justice of Canada since 2017. Since the Supreme Court was established in 1875, 18 people have served as chief justice. The court's first chief justice was William Buell Richards; Beverley McLachlin is the longest serving Canadian chief justice (17 years, 341 days), and was the first woman to hold the position.

== History ==
On October 8, 1875, General William O'Grady Haly administered the oath of office to Chief Justice William Buell Richards. A month later on November 8, the five puisne justices took their oath of office. In January 1879, Chief Justice William Buell Richards resigned following pressure from his longtime friend, Prime Minister John A. Macdonald, likely due to Richards' deteriorating health. On January 11, 1879, William Johnstone Ritchie was appointed chief justice by Macdonald.

On September 25, 1892, Chief Justice William Johnstone Ritchie died after a relapse of bronchitis at the age of 78. Early rumors indicated that Prime Minister John Abbott might appoint Justice Minister John Sparrow David Thompson. The opinion that the chief justice should not default to the longest-serving member of the court was prevalent, and prominent Conservative senator James Robert Gowan, who was a chief party advisor on legal matters, opposed this strongly. Senator Gowan wrote Justice Minister Thompson suggesting Justice Strong be allowed to retire and the appointment be delayed, and indicated he had little faith in Strong's work ethic. However, three weeks after becoming prime minister, Thompson appointed Strong as the court's third chief justice.

In April 1896, Parliament under the Conservative government of Prime Minister Mackenzie Bowell amended the Supreme and Exchequer Courts Act to create the title of "Chief Justice of Canada". (Note: An Act further to amend the Supreme and Exchequer Courts Act, S.C. 1896, c. 14) Prior to the amendment, the title was just "chief justice". (Note: The Supreme and Exchequer Court Act, S.C. 1875, c. 11, s. 3)

== Appointment ==
The chief justice is appointed by the Governor in Council under the Supreme Court Act on the advice of the prime minister. The appointment is subject to the Supreme Court Act, which governs the administration and appointment of judges of the court. By this component of the Constitution of Canada, Judges appointed to the court must be "a judge of a superior court of a province or a barrister or advocate of at least ten years standing at the bar of a province."

Tradition dictates that the chief justice be appointed from among the court's puisne judges; in the history of the Court, only two were not: William Buell Richards, and Charles Fitzpatrick. It is also customary that a new chief justice be chosen alternately from among: the three justices who by law must be from Quebec (with its civil law system), and the other six justices from the rest of Canada (representing the common law tradition). Since 1933, this tradition has only been broken once, when Brian Dickson of Manitoba was named to succeed Bora Laskin of Ontario in 1984.

== Duties ==
The chief justice's central duty is to preside at hearings before the Supreme Court. The chief justice presides from the centre chair. If the chief justice is absent, the senior puisne judge presides.

=== Judicial Council ===
The chief justice chairs the Canadian Judicial Council, which is composed of all chief justices and associate chief justices of superior courts in Canada. This body, established in 1971 by the Judges Act, organizes seminars for federally appointed judges, coordinates the discussion of issues of concern to the judiciary, and conducts inquiries, either on public complaint or at the request of a federal or provincial minister of justice or attorney general, into the conduct of any federally appointed judge.

=== Other duties ===
The chief justice is sworn as a member of the Privy Council prior to taking the judicial oath of office. The chief justice also sits on the advisory council of Canada's highest civilian order, the Order of Canada. In practice however, the chief justice abstains from voting on a candidate's removal from the order, presumably because this process has so far only applied to individuals convicted in a lower court of a criminal offence, and could create a conflict of interest for the chief justice if that individual appealed their conviction to the Supreme Court.

Under the Electoral Boundaries Readjustment Act, each province has a three-person commission responsible for modifying that province's federal ridings. The chair of each such commission is appointed by the chief justice of that province; if no appointment is made by the provincial chief justice, the responsibility falls to the chief justice of Canada.

== Administrator of Canada ==
The Constitution Act, 1867 provides that there can be an "Administrator for the Time being carrying on the Government of Canada." (Note: Constitution Act, 1867, s. 10.) The Letters Patent, 1947 respecting the Office of Governor General provide that, should the governor general die, become incapacitated, or be absent from the country for a period of more than one month, the chief justice or, if that office is vacant, the senior puisne justice, of the Supreme Court would become Administrator of Canada and exercise all the powers and duties of the governor general. (Note: Letters Patent Constituting the Office of Governor General of Canada, s. 8.) This has happened on four occasions: chief justices Lyman Duff and Robert Taschereau each did so, in 1940 and 1967 respectively, following the death of the incumbent governor general, as did Chief Justice Beverley McLachlin when the Governor General underwent surgery in 2005. With the resignation of Julie Payette in January 2021, Richard Wagner served as Administrator until the appointment of Mary Simon as governor general in July of the same year.

The chief justice and the other justices of the court serve as deputies of the governor general for the purpose of giving Royal Assent to bills passed by Parliament, signing official documents or receiving credentials of newly appointed high commissioners and ambassadors.

== Current chief justice ==
The current chief justice is Richard Wagner, who took office on December 18, 2017, succeeding Beverley McLachlin. Born in Montreal on April 2, 1957, Wagner had been a puisne Supreme Court justice for 5 years, 74 days at the time of his elevation to chief justice. He previously sat on the Quebec Court of Appeal.

== List of chief justices ==
Since the Supreme Court was established in 1875, the following 18 persons have served as Chief Justice:

Image	Name (Province)	Order and term (Note: The start date listed for each chief justice is the day the justice took the judicial oath of office, and the end date is the date of the justice's death, resignation, or retirement.)		Length of term	Appointed on advice of	Date of birth	Date of death
	William Buell Richards (Ontario)	1st	September 30, 1875 – January 10, 1879	3 years, 102 days	Mackenzie	May 2, 1815	January 26, 1889
	William Johnstone Ritchie (New Brunswick)	2nd	January 11, 1879 – September 25, 1892	13 years, 258 days	Macdonald	October 28, 1813	September 25, 1892 (Note: Died in office)
	Samuel Henry Strong (Ontario)	3rd	December 13, 1892 – November 17, 1902	9 years, 339 days	Thompson	August 13, 1825	August 31, 1909
	Henri Elzéar Taschereau (Quebec)	4th	November 21, 1902 – May 1, 1906	3 years, 161 days	Laurier	October 7, 1836	April 14, 1911
	Charles Fitzpatrick (Note: Appointed directly from the Cabinet, and never served as puisne justice; only time the chief justiceship has been filled from outside the judiciary.) (Quebec)	5th	June 4, 1906 – October 20, 1918	12 years, 138 days	Laurier	December 19, 1851	June 17, 1942
	Louis Henry Davies (Prince Edward Island)	6th	October 23, 1918 – May 1, 1924	5 years, 191 days	Borden	May 4, 1845	May 1, 1924
	Francis Alexander Anglin (Ontario)	7th	September 16, 1924 – February 27, 1933	8 years, 164 days	King	April 2, 1865	March 2, 1933
	Lyman Duff (British Columbia)	8th	March 17, 1933 – January 6, 1944 (Note: Assumed vice regal duties as Administrator of Canada February 11 – June 21, 1940, following the death in office of Governor General Lord Tweedsmuir.)	10 years, 295 days	Bennett	January 7, 1865	April 26, 1955
	Thibaudeau Rinfret (Quebec)	9th	January 8, 1944 – June 21, 1954	10 years, 164 days	King	June 22, 1879	July 25, 1962
	Patrick Kerwin (Ontario)	10th	July 1, 1954 – February 2, 1963	8 years, 216 days	St. Laurent	October 25, 1889	February 2, 1963
	Robert Taschereau (Quebec)	11th	April 22, 1963 – August 31, 1967 (Note: Assumed vice regal duties as Administrator of Canada March 5 – April 17, 1967, following the death in office of Governor General Georges Vanier.)	4 years, 131 days	Pearson	September 10, 1896	July 26, 1970
	John Robert Cartwright (Ontario)	12th	September 1, 1967 – March 22, 1970	2 years, 202 days	Pearson	March 23, 1895	November 24, 1979
	Gérald Fauteux (Quebec)	13th	March 23, 1970 – December 22, 1973	3 years, 274 days	P. Trudeau	October 22, 1900	September 14, 1980
	Bora Laskin (Ontario)	14th	December 27, 1973 – March 26, 1984	10 years, 90 days	P. Trudeau	October 5, 1912	March 26, 1984
	Brian Dickson (Manitoba)	15th	April 18, 1984 – June 29, 1990	6 years, 72 days	P. Trudeau	May 25, 1916	October 17, 1998
	Antonio Lamer (Quebec)	16th	July 1, 1990 – January 6, 2000	9 years, 189 days	Mulroney	July 8, 1933	November 24, 2007
	Beverley McLachlin (British Columbia)	17th	January 7, 2000 – December 14, 2017 (Note: Assumed vice regal duties as Administrator of Canada in July 2005 when Governor General Adrienne Clarkson underwent surgery.)	17 years, 341 days	Chrétien	September 7, 1943	(living)
	Richard Wagner (Quebec)	18th	December 18, 2017 – Incumbent (Note: Assumed vice-regal duties as Administrator of Canada January 23 – July 26, 2021, following the resignation of Governor-General Julie Payette.)	8 years, 263 days (Note: As of September 7, 2026)	J. Trudeau	April 2, 1957	(living)

This graphical timeline depicts the length of each justice's tenure as chief justice:

== Notes ==
Order of precedence
Preceded by Justin Trudeau as Prime Minister of Canada	Chief Justice of Canada; Canadian order of precedence (ceremonial)	Succeeded by Former Governors General of Canada in order of their departure from office
