= Administrator of the Government of Canada =

Person acting in viceregal role in Canada

- Administrateur du gouvernement du Canada
- Viceregal flag
- Incumbent; Vacant since July 26, 2021
- Government of Canada
- Style: His/Her Excellency
- Type: Acting viceroy
- Reports to: Monarch of Canada
- Seat: Rideau Hall
- Appointer: The Crown on the advice of the prime minister of Canada
- Term length: Until the office of Governor General is no longer vacant with a new appointment Only when a dormant commission has been invoked
- Constituting instrument: Letters Patent, 1947
- Formation: July 1, 1867
- First holder: Lyman Duff
- Deputy: Deputy of the Governor General of Canada
- Website: www.gg.ca

Administrator of the Government of Canada (French: administrateur du gouvernement du Canada) is the title used by the individual performing the duties of Governor General of Canada – the federal viceregal representative – while the office is vacant or its incumbent is otherwise unable to perform his or her duties. The position is defined in the Letters Patent, 1947, which created the office of Governor General in its present-day form. Should it be necessary to fill the position, the chief justice of Canada may act as the administrator, followed by the puisne justices in order of seniority if the chief justice is unable to assume the role. Accordingly, the position is a temporary one meant to serve only during a vacancy in the office of governor general, and it is not a title that is consistently held by the chief justice at all times. It is invoked under the terms of a dormant commission.

The administrator of Canada represents the Crown in right of the federal government. The position of administrator may also exist in a provincial context, when a lieutenant governor is unable to perform his or her role of representing the Crown in right of a province.

== Designation ==
The provisions to select the administrator of Canada is outlined in Article VIII of the Letters Patent, 1947, which identifies that the chief justice of Canada assumes the role as administrator should the need arise. In the absence of the chief justice, the senior puisne justice of the Supreme Court of Canada is designated as the administrator of the government. Prior to the Letters Patent, 1947, the administrator of the government was directly appointed by the monarch. An administrator of the government is not required if a governor general is absent for less than 30 days, with the governor general empowered to designate a "deputy governor general" to act on their behalf. Richard Wagner is the most recent person to be designated as the administrator of the Government of Canada.

The office is not automatically filled, as the designee must first take the oath of office, which then invokes the dormant commission.

== Role ==
The administrator of the government is empowered to exercise all of the powers of the governor general as the viceregal representative of the Crown. These may include:

- giving royal assent to bills passed by the legislature;
- issuing Orders in Council and making Governor in Council (Administrator in Council) appointments;
- dissolving Parliament for a general election;
- summoning Parliament after a general election by way of a proclamation;
- choosing a prime minister to form government and seek the confidence of the House of Commons;
- opening each new session of Parliament by reading the Speech from the Throne;
- providing a recommendation for all spending measures initiated by the House of Commons; and
- appointing provincial lieutenant governors and various officers, including High Commissioners, Ambassadors and diplomats.

== Notable instances ==
The role of the Chief Justice of Canada serving as the Administrator of the Government of Canada originated in 1901, when the government of Prime Minister Wilfrid Laurier refused to accept the general officer commanding in Halifax as the Administrator of the Government of Canada. Instead, on the suggestion of the Cabinet, Samuel Henry Strong as the Chief Justice of Canada was appointed to the role for the first time. Strong's successor as Chief Justice Henri-Elzéar Taschereau made a public issue that he was not entitled to the title "Excellency" when acting in the role of Administrator, claiming it was a deliberate slight to Canadians. Reluctantly, Sir Joseph Pope, the Clerk of the Canadian Privy Council, and the Colonial Office acknowledged that the title "Excellency" was appropriate for the Chief Justice in the role.

Sir Lyman Duff served as administrator on two occasions. The first was in 1931, while Duff was still a puisne justice, between the departure of the Marquess of Willingdon for England on January 16, 1931, and the arrival of the Earl of Bessborough on April 4; in this context, on March 12 of that year, he became the first Canadian-born person ever to read a Speech from the Throne to open a session of the Parliament of Canada. After becoming chief justice in 1933, he served a second stint as administrator from February 11 to June 21, 1940, between the death of the Baron Tweedsmuir in office and the appointment of the Earl of Athlone.

On February 1, 1952, King George VI approved the appointment of Vincent Massey as the next governor general. The incumbent, Field Marshal the Viscount Alexander of Tunis, then left Canada, with Thibaudeau Rinfret becoming administrator until Massey could be sworn in. The King died on February 6, so it was Rinfret who proclaimed Elizabeth II as Queen of Canada. Massey was sworn in on February 28.

Following Georges Vanier's death in office in March 1967, Robert Taschereau served as administrator for several weeks until the appointment of Roland Michener.

On June 8, 1974, Governor General Jules Léger suffered a stroke. Chief Justice Bora Laskin acted as administrator during that time for approximately six months. Laskin's tenure as administrator included:

- a six-day royal visit from the Queen Mother;
- the 30th federal general election;
- the swearing-in ceremony of the new Cabinet;
- the opening of the 30th Parliament and the delivery of the Speech from the Throne;
- bearing witness to the appointment of the Speaker of the Senate;
- granting Royal Assent to a bill; and
- naming a deputy administrator.

Former chief justice Beverley McLachlin became the administrator for a few weeks in July 2005 when then-governor general Adrienne Clarkson was hospitalized. During that time, McLachlin gave royal assent to the Civil Marriage Act, which legalized same-sex marriages.

Richard Wagner was sworn in as administrator in January 2021 following the resignation of Julie Payette over workplace harassment allegations. He served as administrator until Mary Simon was sworn in as Canada's 30th Governor General on July 26, 2021.

== Provincial administrators ==
As each province has a lieutenant-governor representing the Crown in right of a province, administrators can also be designated on a provincial level, performing all of the functions of the lieutenant-governor in their absence.

If a lieutenant-governor cannot act in their role, a Governor in Council appointment designates a provincial administrator. For example, the Governor in Council on the advice of the minister of Canadian heritage issued an Order in Council in 2017 that in the province of Ontario, the chief justice of Ontario and other judges of the courts of Ontario, in order of seniority, can act as the administrator of the Government of Ontario.

Unlike federal administrators, provincial administrators “die with the Lieutenant-Governor” and cannot execute the viceregal office during a vacancy.

== See also ==
- List of administrators of the Government of Canada
- Administrator of the government
- Monarchy of Canada
- Prime Minister of Canada
