= Deputy of the Governor General of Canada =

Individual appointed to act in the stead of the governor general of Canada

A deputy of the governor general (French: gouverneur général suppléant) is, per the Constitution Act, 1867, one of any individuals appointed by the governor general of Canada, with the Canadian monarch's consent, to act in their stead, exercising any powers so delegated to them by the governor general—generally all save for dissolving Parliament, granting royal assent, signing orders in council, issuing royal proclamations, or receiving the credentials of newly appointed ambassadors to Canada.

Currently, the secretary to the governor general, the deputy secretary to the governor general, and the justices of the supreme court are called upon to act as deputies of the governor general; when the latter are acting in this capacity, they are addressed as The Honourable the Deputy of Her Excellency the Governor General. The deputy's commission will read as follows:

KNOW YOU that being well assured of your loyalty, fidelity and capacity, I, the Right Honourable [Name], Governor General of Canada, under and by virtue of and in pursuance of the power and authority vested in me by the Commission of His Majesty King Charles III, under the Great Seal of Canada, dated the [day] of [month] in the year of Our Lord [year], constituting and appointing me to be Governor General of Canada do hereby nominate, constitute and appoint you, [Name], to be my Deputy within Canada and in that capacity to exercise, subject to any limitations or directions from time to time expressed or given by His Majesty, all the powers, authorities and functions vested in and of right exercisable by me as Governor General, saving and excepting [any powers excluded from the delegation, which will include, at a minimum, the power of dissolving the Parliament of Canada].

== Administrator of Canada ==
The role of deputy of the governor general is separate from that of administrator of Canada. The Letters Patent, 1947, issued by King George VI provide that, in the case of the death, removal, incapacity, or absence of more than one month of the governor general, the chief justice of Canada shall serve as administrator of Canada, exercising all the powers and functions of the governor general until a new governor general is appointed. In the absence or incapacity of the chief justice, the role of administrator falls on the senior puisne justice of the Supreme Court.

Chiefs of the Six Nations of the Grand River expressed to Queen Elizabeth II their concerns about Chief Justice Richard Wagner serving as administrator after Julie Payette resigned from the office of governor general in January 2021. Grand Chief Vernon Watchmaker and Chief Germaine Anderson stated, "the Chief Justice of the Supreme Court of Canada as a 'stand in' does not give us comfort. Many times, our nations have been involved in litigation that ends up at the Supreme Court."
