= Procedures of the Supreme Court of Canada =

The procedures of the Supreme Court of Canada for hearing cases are established in the Rules of the Supreme Court of Canada, the Supreme Court Act, and by tradition.

== Terms and sittings ==
Hearings of the Supreme Court take place exclusively in the Supreme Court building in Ottawa. (Note: In September 2019, the court sat for the first time outside Ottawa, sitting in Winnipeg, Manitoba. This was a pilot project for a possible initiative to regularly sit in locations across Canada to bring the court closer to Canadians.) The Court sits three times a year for three months at a time starting in January, April, and October. Every two weeks that the Court sits is followed by a two-week break making for a total of 18 weeks a year of hearings. The Mondays are often reserved for hearing motions regarding ongoing appeals. The remaining days of the week the Court is used for hearings. The Court will hear one or two cases a day beginning at 9:30 a.m.

Quorum of the Court requires five Justices, but most cases are heard by a panel of seven or nine Justices. The Chief Justice presides over each hearing. If the Chief Justice is not available, the senior puisne justice on the panel will preside.

Hearings are live-streamed through the Court's website. They are also video recorded for delayed telecast in both of Canada's official languages and are often aired on CPAC. The Court's hearings are open to the public except for certain sensitive cases where a sealing order is enacted. There are three rows of benches reserved for public seating, which are generally taken on a first-come, first-served basis except where it is reserved by counsel or parties in the appeal.

== Leave to appeal ==
Initially, all civil and criminal cases had the right to appeal to the Supreme Court. An amendment to the Supreme Court Act in 1975 required that parties wishing to appeal must apply for "leave to appeal". The only exception is a select type of more serious criminal cases where there continues to an appeal "as of right", as well as appeals from reference questions submitted to the provincial courts of appeal by the provincial governments. The federal government also has the power to pose a reference to the Court on its own motion, as an original proceeding, without requiring leave from the Court.

Leave applications are considered by the justices in groups of three. Only cases which raise questions of public importance are granted. The reasons for their decisions on leave applications are not given.

== Hearings ==
On the bench, the Chief Justice of Canada (or the senior puisne justice) presides from the centre chair with the other justices seated to the right and left of the Chief Justice by order of seniority of appointment. At sittings of the Court, the justices usually appear in black silk robes but they wear their ceremonial robes of bright scarlet trimmed with Canadian white mink in court on special occasions and in the Senate at the opening of each new session of Parliament.

Historically, they were addressed as "My Lord/Lady" during sessions of the court, but the Court has indicated that it prefers that the judges be addressed as "Justice", "Mr Justice" or "Madam Justice".

Each side is given one hour to make their submissions. Where there are multiple claimants or defendants they are required to split the time among them. However, in exceptional circumstances the parties may apply to the Court to have their time extended. Interveners are typically granted ten minutes to make their arguments.

== Reasons ==
The Court sometimes gives judgment from the bench, either dismissing or allowing the appeal on the spot. The Court may give short reasons explaining its decision at that time, or it may announce the outcome of the case, with reasons to follow.

The more common practice is that once the hearing is complete, the judges convene immediately in their conference room behind the court room to discuss the case. They sit at a round table in the conference room and each judge gives their opinion of the case, starting with the least senior judge. Typically, once the discussion is complete the justices make a tentative decision of the case, and in most cases a decision will be arrived at by the end the day. Retired Justice Binnie has coined the term the "sundown rule" for this practice.

This practice was begun by Chief Justice Cartwright in the 1960s. It was intended to reduce the number of separate reasons that the court was generating at the time and to maintain relations among the judges.

Except where the reasons are announced orally at the hearing, the Court normally reserves its decision. While the case is on reserve, the judges spend a considerable amount of time producing detailed written reasons for judgment. That process may take several months, or over a year. There is normally a majority decision, but judges who disagree with the majority can write a minority opinion, dissenting in whole or in part from the majority. Any judge can write a concurring opinion, agreeing with either the majority or the minority, or setting out the judge's own separate position. While the reasons for judgment are being developed, they may be rewritten several times. There may be a significant amount of continued debate over how the propositions should be articulated and what should be left out. In the more divided cases, there is a possibility that a judge may switch sides during the process and change the outcome of the case.
