= Governor General of Canada =

Federal representative of the Canadian monarch

- Gouverneure générale du Canada
- Badge of the governor general

- Flag of the governor general

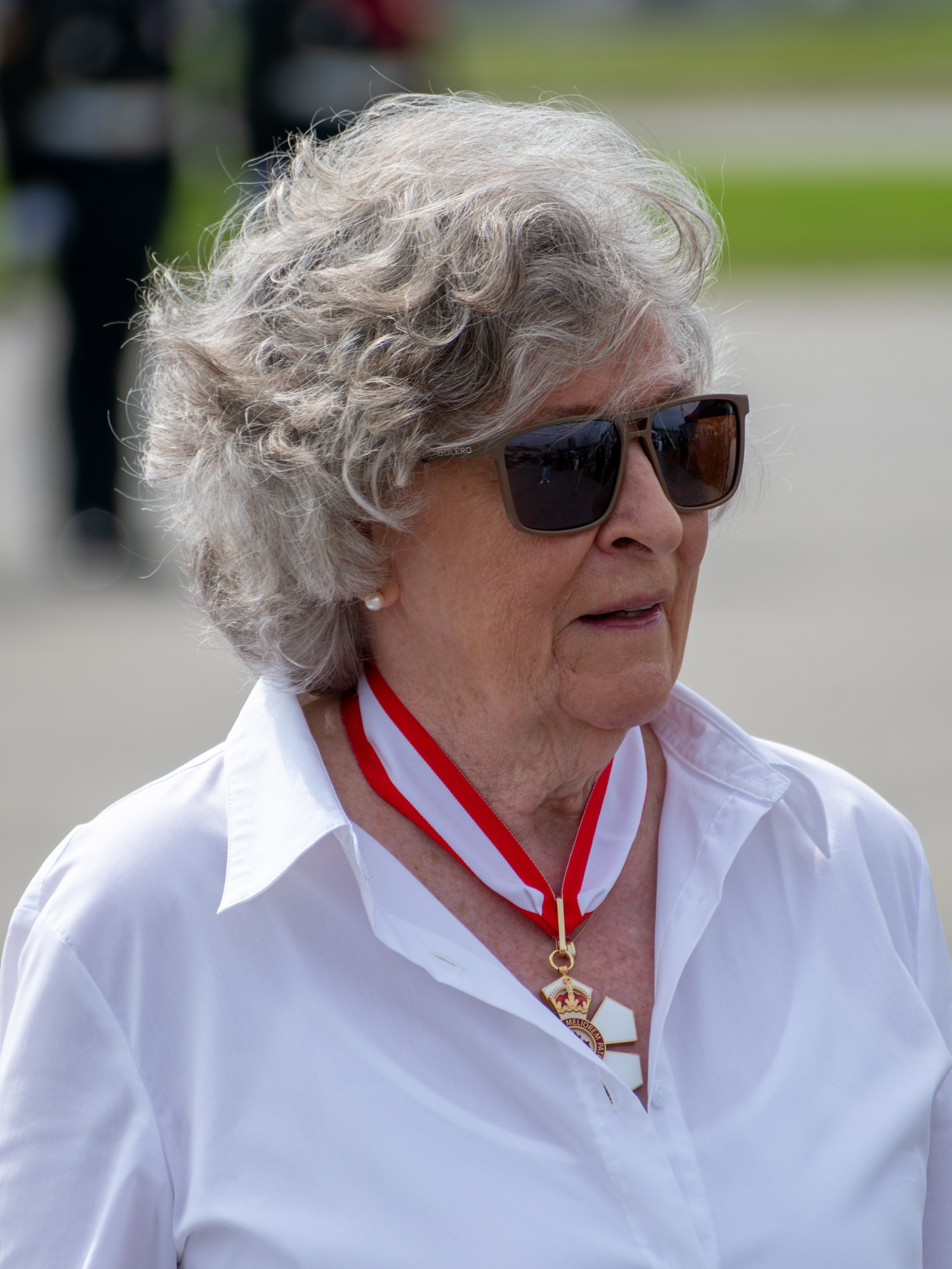
- Incumbent; Louise Arbour since June 8, 2026
- Style: Her Excellency the Right Honourable
- Abbreviation: GG
- Residence: Rideau Hall, Ottawa, Ontario; La Citadelle, Quebec City, Quebec
- Appointer: Monarch of Canada; on the advice of the prime minister
- Term length: At His Majesty's pleasure (generally 5 to 7 years)
- Formation: July 1, 1867
- First holder: The Viscount Monck
- Deputy: Deputies of the governor general: Secretary to the governor general; Justices of the Supreme Court
- Salary: $342,100 annually
- Website: www.gg.ca

The governor general of Canada (French: gouverneure générale du Canada) (Note: When the position is held by a man, the French title is Gouverneur général du Canada.) is the federal representative of the Canadian monarch, currently King Charles III. The monarch of Canada is also sovereign and head of state of 14 other Commonwealth realms and resides in the United Kingdom. The monarch, on the advice of his or her Canadian prime minister, appoints a governor general to administer the government of Canada in the monarch's name. The commission is for an indefinite period—known as serving at His Majesty's pleasure—but is usually for five years. Since 1959, it has also been traditional to alternate between francophone and anglophone officeholders. The 31st and current governor general is Louise Arbour, who was sworn in on 8 June 2026.

As the sovereign's representative, the governor general carries out the day-to-day constitutional and ceremonial duties of the monarch. The constitutional duties include appointing lieutenant governors, Supreme Court justices, and senators; signing orders-in-council; summoning, proroguing, and dissolving the federal parliament; granting royal assent to bills; calling elections; and signing commissions for officers of the Canadian Armed Forces. The ceremonial duties include delivering the speech from the throne at the state opening of parliament; attend the Remembrance Day ceremony in November, accepting letters of credence from incoming ambassadors; and distributing honours, decorations, and medals. Per the tenets of responsible government, the governor general acts almost always (except on the matter of honours) on the advice of the prime minister.

The office began in the 17th century, when the French Crown appointed governors of the colony of Canada and, following the British conquest of the colony in 1763, the British monarch appointed governors of the Province of Quebec (later the Canadas). Consequently, the office is, along with the Crown, the oldest continuous institution in Canada. The present version of the office emerged with Canadian Confederation and the passing of the British North America Act, 1867.

Although the post initially represented the government of the United Kingdom, the office was gradually Canadianized until, with the passage of the Statute of Westminster, 1931, and the establishment of a separate and uniquely Canadian monarchy, the governor general became the direct personal representative of the independently Canadian sovereign (the monarch in his Canadian council). Throughout this process of gradually increasing Canadian independence, the role of governor general took on additional responsibilities, such as acting as commander-in-chief of the Canadian militia in the monarch's stead, and, in 1927, the first official international visit by a governor general was made. In 1947, King George VI issued letters patent allowing the viceroy to exercise almost all powers on behalf of the monarch. As a matter of law, however, the governor general is not in the same constitutional position as the sovereign; the office itself does not, as such, possess any powers of the royal prerogative. Any constitutional amendment that affects the Crown, including the office of governor general, requires the unanimous consent of each provincial legislative assembly as well as the Senate and House of Commons of Canada.

== Appointment ==
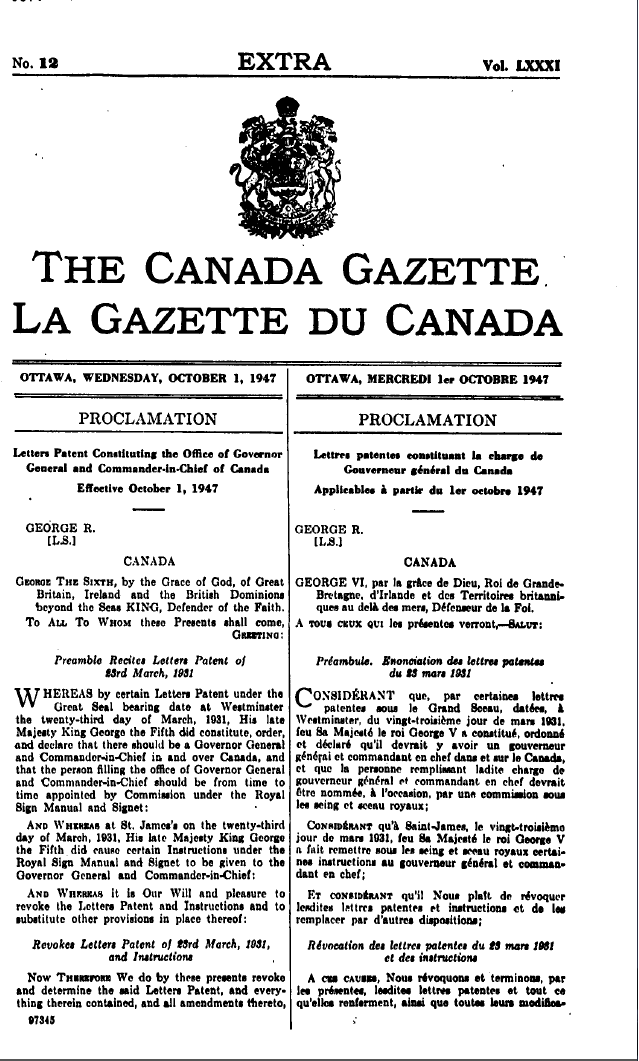
First page of the proclamation of the Letters Patent, 1947, as published in the Canada Gazette

The position of governor general is mandated by both the Constitution Act, 1867 (formerly known as the British North America Act, 1867), and the Letters Patent, 1947 by King George VI. As such, on the recommendation of the Canadian prime minister, the Canadian monarch appoints the governor general by commission, prepared in Canada, and issued under the Great Seal of Canada and with the royal sign-manual. (Until the appointment of Vincent Massey in 1952, the royal commission was authorized by the monarch's signature and signet.) That individual is, from then until being sworn in, referred to as the governor general-designate.

Besides the administration of the oaths of office, there is no set formula for the swearing-in of a governor general-designate. Though there may therefore be variations to the following, the appointee will usually travel to Ottawa, there receiving an official welcome and taking up residence at 7 Rideau Gate, and will begin preparations for their upcoming role, meeting with various high-level officials to ensure a smooth transition between governors general. The sovereign will also hold an audience with the appointee and will at that time induct both the governor general-designate and their spouse into the Order of Canada as Companions, as well as appointing the former as a Commander of both the Order of Military Merit and the Order of Merit of the Police Forces (should either person not have already received either of those honours).

The incumbent will generally serve for at least five years; though, this is only a developed convention and has been criticized as too short for an office meant to represent a Crown and sovereign meant to embody continuity. The governor general serves "at His Majesty's pleasure" (or the royal pleasure), meaning the prime minister may recommend to the King that the viceroy remain in his service for a longer period of time; some governors general have been in office for more than seven years. (Note: Georges Vanier served as governor general between 15 September 1959 and 5 March 1967 and Roland Michener served for just under seven years, from 17 April 1967 to 14 January 1974.) No additional formalities are necessary for such an "extension"; the governor general carries on until death, (Note: Lord Tweedsmuir died at the Montreal Neurological Institute and Hospital on 11 February 1940 and Georges Vanier died at Rideau Hall on 5 March 1967.) resignation, (Note: Roméo LeBlanc resigned the viceregal post in 1999 and Julie Payette resigned in 2021.) or the appointment of his or her successor. Only once, with the Earl Alexander of Tunis, has a royal proclamation been issued to end a governor general's incumbency. (Note: As Alexander was to be appointed to the British Cabinet and the announcement made while he was still in Canada, the Canadian Cabinet felt it necessary to end Alexander's service as viceroy immediately, while sparing him the indignity of resignation.)

Should a governor general die, resign, or leave the country for longer than one month, the chief justice of Canada (or, if that position is vacant or unavailable, the senior puisne justice of the Supreme Court) serves as the administrator of the government of Canada and exercises all powers of the governor general. (Note: The only individuals to serve as administrators of the government of Canada due to the deaths in office of governors general were Chief Justice Sir Lyman Poore Duff in 1940 and Chief Justice Robert Taschereau in 1967.)

=== Selection ===
In a speech on the subject of Confederation, made in 1866 to the Legislative Assembly of the Province of Canada, John A. Macdonald said of the planned governor, "we place no restriction on Her Majesty's prerogative in the selection of her representative ... The sovereign has unrestricted freedom of choice ... We leave that to Her Majesty in all confidence." However, between 1867 and 1931, governors general were appointed by the monarch on the advice of the British Cabinet; until 1890, by the secretary of state for the colonies for approval by the prime minister. After that, a policy of consulting the Canadian Cabinet was established; though, this process was not always followed.

The Balfour Declaration of 1926 recognized the governor general as no longer a stand-in for the British government, but, rather a direct representative of the Crown. At the Imperial Conference in 1930, it was decided that the Commonwealth ministers would "tender their formal advice after informal consultation with His Majesty", thereby settling the current procedure wherein the monarch appoints the governor general on the advice of the Canadian prime minister only. This was codified in the Statute of Westminster, 1931.

How many names the prime minister puts forward to the sovereign has varied. Richard Bennett suggested a number of names in an informal letter to King George V in 1930, all of which the King approved, leading Bennett to pick Vere Ponsonby, 9th Earl of Bessborough. Mackenzie King in 1945 gave three names to King George VI, who chose Harold Alexander (later the Viscount Alexander of Tunis). Mackenzie King then made the formal recommendation to the King, which was accepted. Louis St. Laurent, however, gave only one name—Massey's—to George VI. There is typically informal consultation between the prime minister and sovereign, either directly or via the incumbent governor general, on the appointment of the next viceroy before the prime minister gives his official advice to the monarch.

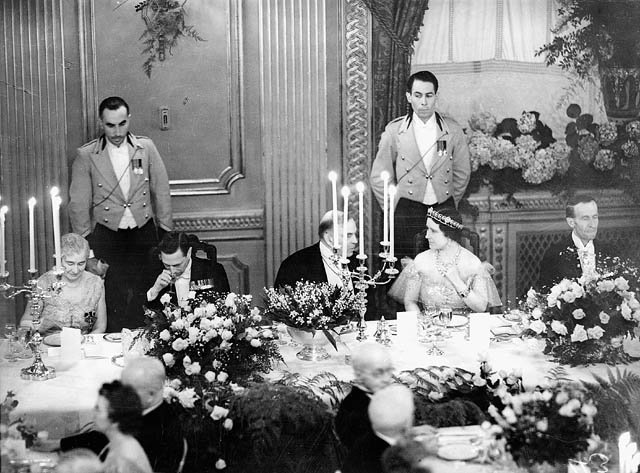
(Left to right) The wife of Thomas Crerar, King George VI, Prime Minister William Lyon Mackenzie King, Queen Elizabeth, and Governor General the Lord Tweedsmuir at the Château Laurier hotel in Ottawa, 1939. Mackenzie King was the only leader of the opposition to be involved in the appointment of a governor general, in 1935 deciding with then-prime minister Richard Bennett to choose Tweedsmuir.

The only time the leader of the opposition was consulted on the choice of name to put forward to the monarch for appointment as viceroy was when Lord Tweedsmuir's predecessor, Bessborough, wished to resign as governor general coincidentally just ahead of Parliament reaching the end of its maximum five year life in July 1935, after which an election was required. Mackenzie King, at the time leader of the opposition, expected to win a majority in the upcoming election and stated he would not accept a governor general recommended by then-Prime Minister Bennett, which was a constitutionally unjustifiable position for Mackenzie King to take. King George V became concerned and instructed Bessborough to either remain in office until after the election or bring Bennett and Mackenzie King together to agree on a nominee for his replacement. The governor general consulted with the prime minister and leader of the opposition and settled on Tweedsmuir.

Until 1952, all governors general were members of the British aristocracy or former British military officers, diplomats, or politicians raised to the peerage. These viceroys had spent no or little time in Canada prior to their appointment; though it was claimed as their travel schedules were so extensive that they could "learn more about Canada in five years than many Canadians in a lifetime". The idea of a Canadian being appointed governor general was raised as early as 1919, when, at the Paris Peace Conference, Canadian prime minister Sir Robert Borden, consulted with South African prime minister Louis Botha, agreeing that viceregal appointees should be long-term residents of their respective dominions. Calls for just such an individual to be made viceroy came again in the late 1930s, but, it was not until Massey's appointment by King George VI in 1952 that the position was filled by a Canadian-born individual. The prime minister at the time, Louis St. Laurent, wrote in a letter to the media, "[i]t seems to me no one of the King's subjects, wherever he resides, should be considered unworthy to represent the King, provided he has the personal qualifications and a position in the community which are consonant with the dignity and responsibility of that office." Massey stated of this, "a Canadian [as governor general] makes it far easier to look on the Crown as our own and on the Sovereign as Queen of Canada."

This practice continued until 1999, when Queen Elizabeth II commissioned as her representative Adrienne Clarkson, a Hong Kong-born refugee to Canada. Moreover, the practice of alternating between francophone and anglophone Canadians was instituted with the appointment of Vanier, a francophone who succeeded the anglophone Massey. All persons whose names are put forward to the King for approval must first undergo background checks by the Royal Canadian Mounted Police and the Canadian Security Intelligence Service.

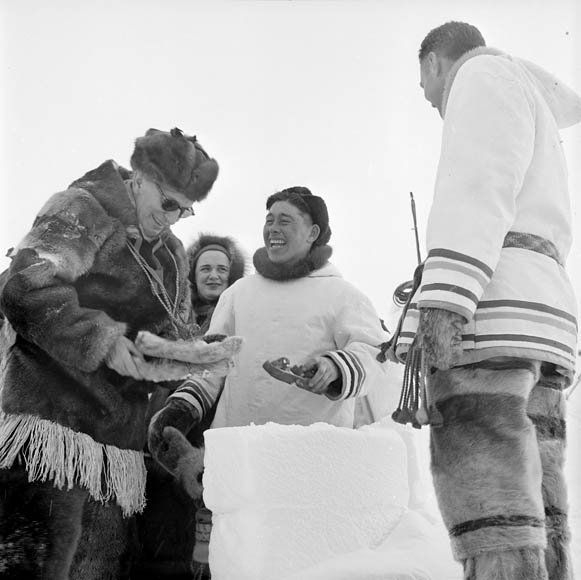
Vincent Massey (left), the first Canadian-born viceroy since Confederation

Although required by the tenets of constitutional monarchy to be nonpartisan while in office, governors general were often former politicians; a number held seats in the British House of Lords by virtue of their inclusion in the peerage. Appointments of former ministers of the Crown in the 1980s and 1990s were criticized by Peter H. Russell, who stated in 2009: "much of [the] advantage of the monarchical system is lost in Canada when prime ministers recommend partisan colleagues to be appointed governor general and represent [the King]." Clarkson was the first governor general in Canadian history with neither a political or military background, as well as the first Asian-Canadian and the second woman, following on Jeanne Sauvé. The third woman to hold this position was also the first Caribbean-Canadian governor general, Michaëlle Jean.

There have been, from time to time, proposals put forward for modifications to the selection process. Citizens for a Canadian Republic has advocated the election of the nominee to the sovereign, either by popular or parliamentary vote; a proposal echoed by Clarkson, who called for the prime minister's choice to not only be vetted by a parliamentary committee, but, also submit to a televised quiz on Canadiana. Constitutional scholars, editorial boards, and the Monarchist League of Canada have argued against any such constitutional tinkering with the viceregal appointment process, stating that the position being "not elected is an asset, not a handicap", and that an election would politicize the office, thereby undermining the impartiality necessary to the proper functioning of the governor general. Retired University of Ottawa professor John E. Trent proposed the governor general be head of state and selected by the Officers of the Order of Canada, something Chris Selley argued would politicize both the head of state and the Order of Canada, itself. In 2021, Grand Chief Vernon Watchmaker and Chief Germaine Anderson of the Six Nations of the Grand River wrote to Queen Elizabeth II, suggesting that the federal Cabinet consult treaty nations before the appointment of a new governor general, stating, "we are partners with the Crown."

A new approach was used in 2010 for the selection of David Johnston as governor general-designate. For the task, prime minister Stephen Harper convened a special search group—the Governor General Consultation Committee—which was instructed to find a non-partisan candidate who would respect the monarchical aspects of the viceregal office and conducted extensive consultations with more than 200 people across the country. In 2012, the committee was made permanent and renamed as the Advisory Committee on Vice-Regal Appointments, with a modified membership and its scope broadened to include the appointment of provincial lieutenant governors and territorial commissioners (though, the latter are not personal representatives of the monarch). However, the next ministry, headed by Justin Trudeau, disbanded the committee in 2017, before he recommended Payette as Johnston's successor that year. Following Payette's resignation, Trudeau formed the Advisory Group on the Selection of the Next Governor General, which selected Mary Simon for appointment as vicereine.

=== Swearing-in ceremony ===
Michaëlle Jean swearing the oaths of office as administered by puisne justice Michel Bastarache, September 27, 2005

The swearing-in ceremony begins with the arrival at 7 Rideau Gate of one of the ministers of the Crown, who then accompanies the governor general-designate to Parliament Hill, where a Canadian Forces guard of honour (consisting of the Army Guard, Royal Canadian Air Force Guard, and Flag Party of the Royal Canadian Navy) awaits to give a general salute. From there, the party is led by the King's parliamentary messenger—the usher of the Black Rod—to the Senate chamber, wherein all justices of the Supreme Court, senators, members of parliament, and other guests are assembled. The King's commission for the governor general-designate is then read aloud by the secretary to the governor general and the required oaths are administered to the appointee by either the chief justice or one of the puisne justices of the Supreme Court. The three oaths are the Oath of Allegiance, the Oath of Office as Governor General and Commander-in-Chief, and the Oath as Keeper of the Great Seal of Canada. With the affixing of their signature to these three solemn promises, the individual is officially the governor general, and at that moment the flag of the governor general of Canada is raised on the Peace Tower, the "Vice Regal Salute" is played by the Central Band of the Canadian Armed Forces, and a 21-gun salute is conducted by the Royal Regiment of Canadian Artillery. The governor general is seated on the throne while a prayer is read, and then receives the Great Seal of Canada (which is passed to the registrar general for protection), as well as the chains of both the chancellor of the Order of Canada and of the Order of Military Merit. The governor general then gives a speech, outlining causes they will champion during their time as viceroy.

== Role ==
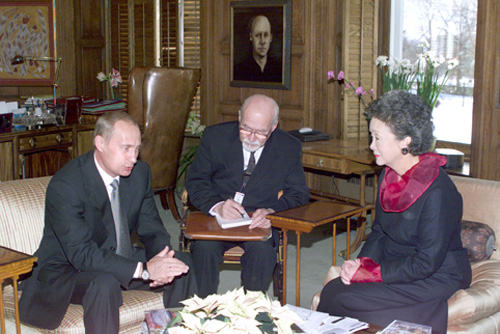
Governor General Adrienne Clarkson (right) meets with Russian president Vladimir Putin (left) in the governor general's study of Rideau Hall, 18 December 2000

If, and because your Governor-General is in the service of the Crown, he is, therefore ... in the service of Canada ... [A]loof though he be from actual executive responsibility, his attitude must be that of ceaseless and watchful readiness to take part ... in the fostering of every influence that will sweeten and elevate public life; to ... join in making known the resources and developments of the country; to vindicate, if required, the rights of the people and the ordinariness and Constitution, and lastly, to promote by all means in his power, without reference to class or creed, every movement and every institution calculated to forward the social, moral, and religious welfare of the inhabitants of the Dominion.

— Governor General the Marquess of Aberdeen, 1893

Canada shares the person of the sovereign equally with 14 other countries in the Commonwealth of Nations and that individual, in the monarch's capacity as the Canadian sovereign, has 10 other legal personas within the Canadian federation. As the sovereign works and resides in the United Kingdom, the governor general's primary task is to perform federal constitutional duties on behalf of the monarch. As such, the governor general carries on "the government of Canada on behalf and in the name of the sovereign".

The governor general acts within the principles of parliamentary democracy and responsible government as a guarantor of continuous and stable governance and as a nonpartisan safeguard against the abuse of power. For the most part, however, the powers of the Crown are exercised on a day-to-day basis by elected and appointed individuals, leaving the governor general to perform the various ceremonial duties the sovereign otherwise carries out when in the country; at such a moment, the governor general removes him or herself from public, (Note: Governor General the Lord Tweedsmuir said of King George VI being in the Senate in 1939 to grant Royal Assent to bills: "[When the King of Canada is present] I cease to exist as Viceroy, and retain only a shadowy legal existence as Governor General in Council.") though the presence of the monarch does not affect the governor general's ability to perform governmental roles.

Past governor general John Campbell, Marquess of Lorne, said of the job, "it is no easy thing to be a governor general of Canada. You must have the patience of a saint, the smile of a cherub, the generosity of an Indian prince, and the back of a camel", and the Earl of Dufferin stated that the governor general is "a representative of all that is august, stable, and sedate in the government, the history and the traditions of the country; incapable of partizanship and lifted far above the atmosphere of faction; without adherents to reward or opponents to oust from office; docile to the suggestions of his Ministers and, yet, securing to the people the certainty of being able to get rid of an administration or parliament the moment either had forfeited their confidence."

=== Constitutional role ===
All executive, legislative, and judicial power in and over Canada is vested in the monarch. The governor general is permitted to exercise most of this power, including the royal prerogative, in the sovereign's name; some as outlined in the Constitution Act, 1867, and some through various letters patent issued over the decades, particularly those from 1947 that constitute the Office of Governor General of Canada. The 1947 letters patent state, "and We do hereby authorize and empower Our Governor General, with the advice of Our Privy Council for Canada or of any members thereof or individually, as the case requires, to exercise all powers and authorities lawfully belonging to Us in respect of Canada." The office itself does not, however, independently possess any powers of the royal prerogative, only exercising the Crown's powers with its permission; a fact the Constitution Act, 1867, left unchanged. Among other duties, the monarch retains the sole right to appoint the governor general. It is also stipulated that the governor general may appoint deputies—usually Supreme Court justices and the secretary to the governor general—who can perform some of the viceroy's constitutional duties in the governor general's absence, and the chief justice of the Supreme Court (or a puisne justice in the chief justice's absence) will act as the administrator of the government upon the death or removal, as well as the incapacitation, or absence of the governor general for more than one month.

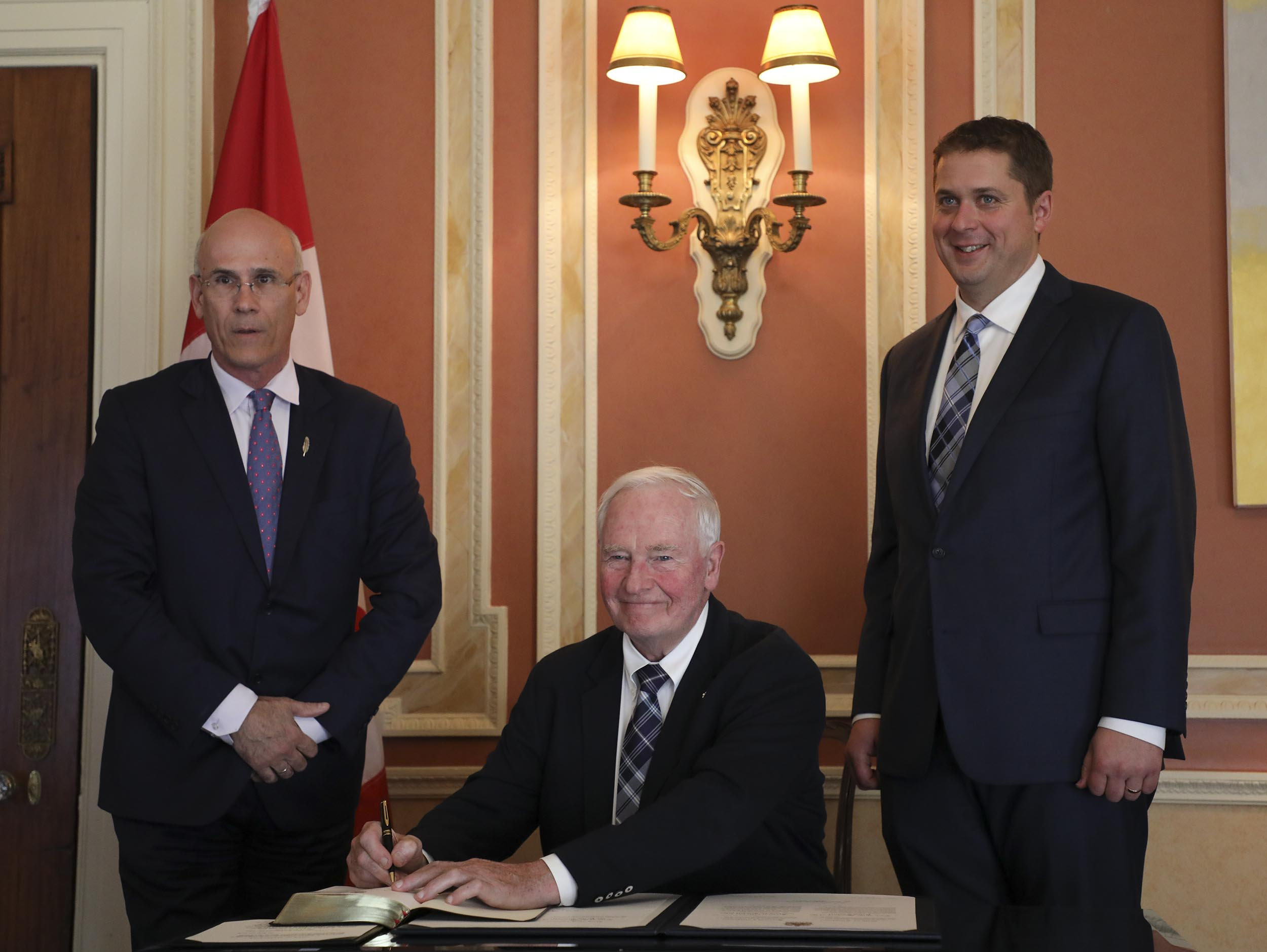
Andrew Scheer (right), then Leader of Her Majesty's Loyal Opposition, being admitted to the Queen's Privy Council for Canada by Governor General David Johnston (centre) at Rideau Hall, 25 September 2017

The governor general is required by the Constitution Act, 1867, to appoint for life persons to the King's Privy Council for Canada, who are all technically tasked with tendering to the monarch and viceroy guidance on the exercise of the royal prerogative. Convention dictates, though, that the governor general must draw from the Privy Council an individual to appoint as prime minister. In almost all cases, this is the member of Parliament who commands the confidence of the House of Commons, whom the governor general must appoint to the Privy Council, if that person is not already a member, so the individual can be appointed prime minister. The prime minister then advises the governor general to appoint other members of parliament to a committee of the Privy Council known as the Cabinet and it is, in practice, only from this group of ministers of the Crown that the king and governor general will take advice on the use of executive power; an arrangement called the king-in-Council or, more specifically, the governor-in-Council. In this capacity, the governor general will issue royal proclamations and sign orders in council. The governor-in-Council is also specifically tasked by the Constitution Act, 1867, to appoint in the monarch's name, the lieutenant governors of the provinces, senators, the speaker of the Senate, superior, district, and county court judges in each province, except those of the Courts of Probate in Nova Scotia and New Brunswick, and high commissioners and ambassadors. The advice given by the Cabinet is, in order to ensure the stability of government, by political convention typically binding. The governor general has mainly only the right to advise, encourage, and warn; to offer valued counsel to the prime minister.

Both the King and his viceroy, however, may in exceptional circumstances invoke the reserve powers, which remain the Crown's final check against a ministry's abuse of power. (Note: See Note 2 at King's Privy Council for Canada.) The reserve power of dismissal has never been used in Canada, although other reserve powers have been employed to force the prime minister to resign on two occasions. In 1896, prime minister Charles Tupper refused to step down after his party failed to win a majority in the House of Commons during that year's election, leading governor general Gordon to no longer recognize Tupper as prime minister and disapprove of several appointments Tupper had recommended. In 1925, the King–Byng affair took place, in which prime minister Mackenzie King, facing a non-confidence motion in the House of Commons, advised governor general Byng to dissolve the new parliament, but Byng refused.

Peter Hogg, a constitutional scholar, has opined that "a system of responsible government cannot work without a formal head of state who is possessed of certain reserve powers." Further, Eugene Forsey stated "the reserve power is indeed, under our Constitution, an absolutely essential safeguard of democracy. It takes the place of the legal and judicial safeguards provided in the United States by written Constitutions, enforceable in the courts."

Within the dominions, until the 1920s, most reserve powers were exercised by a governor general on the advice of either the local or the British Cabinet, with the latter taking precedence. After the Imperial Conference of 1926 produced the Balfour Declaration, formally establishing the autonomy and equal status of Commonwealth governments, governors general ceased to be advised in any way by British ministers.

It was decided at the same Imperial Conference that the governor general "should be kept as fully informed as His Majesty the King in Great Britain of Cabinet business and public affairs." How frequently governors general and their prime ministers conversed has varied; some prime ministers have valued their meetings with the viceroy at the time. (Note: Robert Borden said, "it would be an absolute mistake to regard the governor general as a mere figurehead, a mere rubber stamp. During nine years of premiership, I had the opportunity of realizing how helpful may be the advice and counsel of a governor general in matters of delicacy and difficulty".) However, the practice is usually informal and the prime minister will typically schedule a telephone call to request the governor general perform a significant task. (Note: Pierre Trudeau called Roland Michener in 1970 to request an authorization to invoke the War Measures Act.) The governor general regularly receives the minutes from cabinet meetings and any documents referred to in those minutes.

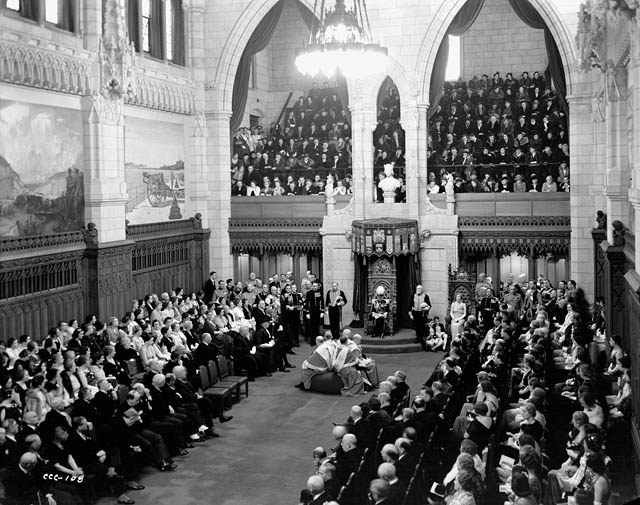
Lord Tweedsmuir gives the Throne Speech at the opening of the third session of the 18th Canadian Parliament, 27 January 1938

The governor general also summons parliament, reads the speech from the throne, and prorogues and dissolves parliament. The governor general grants royal assent in the king's name; legally, the governor general has three options: grant royal assent (making the bill a law), withhold royal assent (vetoing the bill), or reserve the bill for the signification of the king's pleasure (allowing the sovereign to personally grant or withhold assent). If the governor general withholds the king's assent, the sovereign may within two years disallow the bill, thereby annulling the law in question. No governor general has denied royal assent to a bill. Provincial viceroys, however, are able to reserve royal assent to provincial bills for the governor general, which was last invoked in 1961 by the lieutenant governor of Saskatchewan.

=== Ceremonial role ===
With most constitutional functions lent to Cabinet, the governor general acts in a primarily ceremonial fashion. The governor general will host members of Canada's royal family, as well as foreign royalty and heads of state, and will represent the King and country abroad on state visits to other nations, though the monarch's permission is necessary, via the prime minister, for the viceroy to leave Canada. Also as part of international relations, the governor general issues letters of credence and of recall for Canadian ambassadors and high commissioners and receives the same from foreign ambassadors and other Commonwealth countries' high commissioners appointed to Canada.

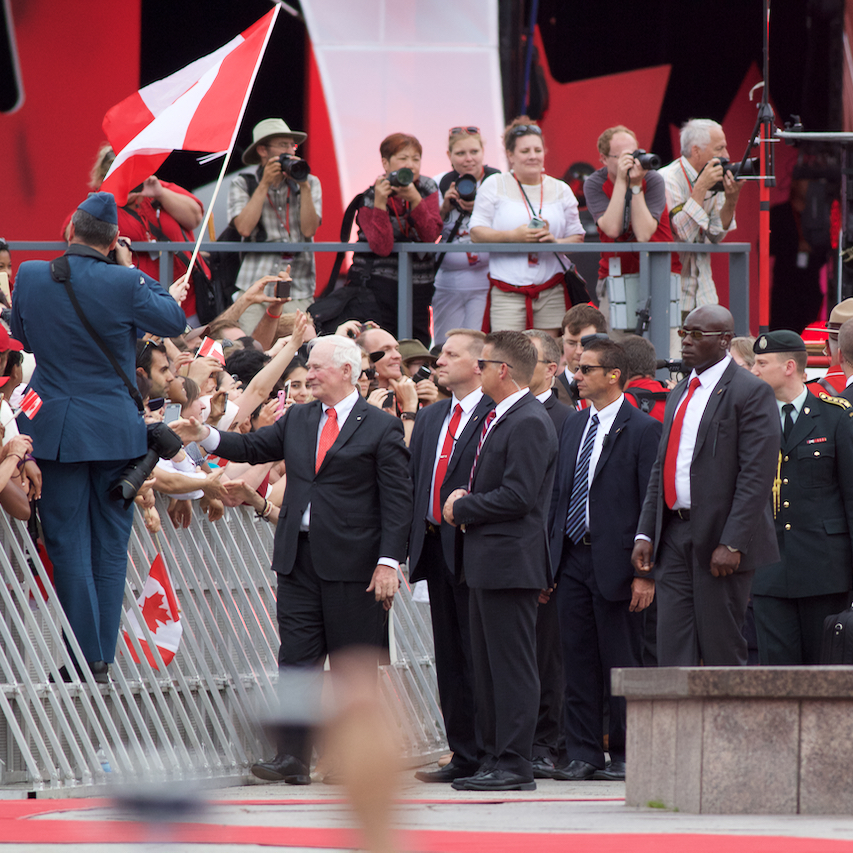
Governor general David Johnston greeting a crowd during Canada Day celebrations in Ottawa, July 2016

The governor general is also tasked with fostering national unity and pride. Queen Elizabeth II stated in 1959 to governor general Massey, "maintain[ing] the right relationship between the Crown and the people of Canada [is] the most important function among the many duties of the appointment which you have held with such distinction." One way in which this is carried out is travelling the country and meeting with Canadians from all regions and ethnic groups in Canada, continuing the tradition begun in 1869 by governor general John Young. The governor general will also induct individuals into the various national orders and present national medals and decorations. Similarly, the viceroy administers and distributes the Governor General's Awards, and will also give out awards associated with private organizations, some of which are named for past governors general. During a federal election, the governor general will curtail these public duties, so as not to appear as though they are involving themselves in political affairs.

Although the constitution of Canada states that the "Command-in-Chief of the Land and Naval Militia, and of all Naval and Military Forces, of and in Canada, is hereby declared to continue and be vested in the Queen," the governor general acts in his place as commander-in-chief of the Canadian Forces and is permitted through the 1947 letters patent to use the title Commander-in-Chief in and over Canada. The position technically involves issuing commands for Canadian troops, sailors, and aviators but is predominantly a ceremonial role in which the viceroy will visit Canadian Forces bases across Canada and abroad to take part in military ceremonies, see troops off to and return from deployments, and encourage excellence and morale amongst the forces. The governor general also serves as honorary Colonel of three household regiments: the Governor General's Horse Guards, Governor General's Foot Guards and Canadian Grenadier Guards. This ceremonial position is directly under that of Colonel-in-Chief, which is held by the King. Since 1910, the governor general was also always made the chief scout for Canada, which was renamed Chief Scout of Canada after 1946 and again in 2011 as Patron Scout.

== Residences and household ==
Rideau Hall, in Ottawa, is the official residence of the Canadian monarch and of the governor general and is thus the location of the viceregal household and the Chancellery of Honours. For a part of each year since 1872, governors general have also resided at the Citadel (La Citadelle) in Quebec City, Quebec. A governor general's wife is known as the chatelaine of Rideau Hall, though there is no equivalent term for a governor general's husband.

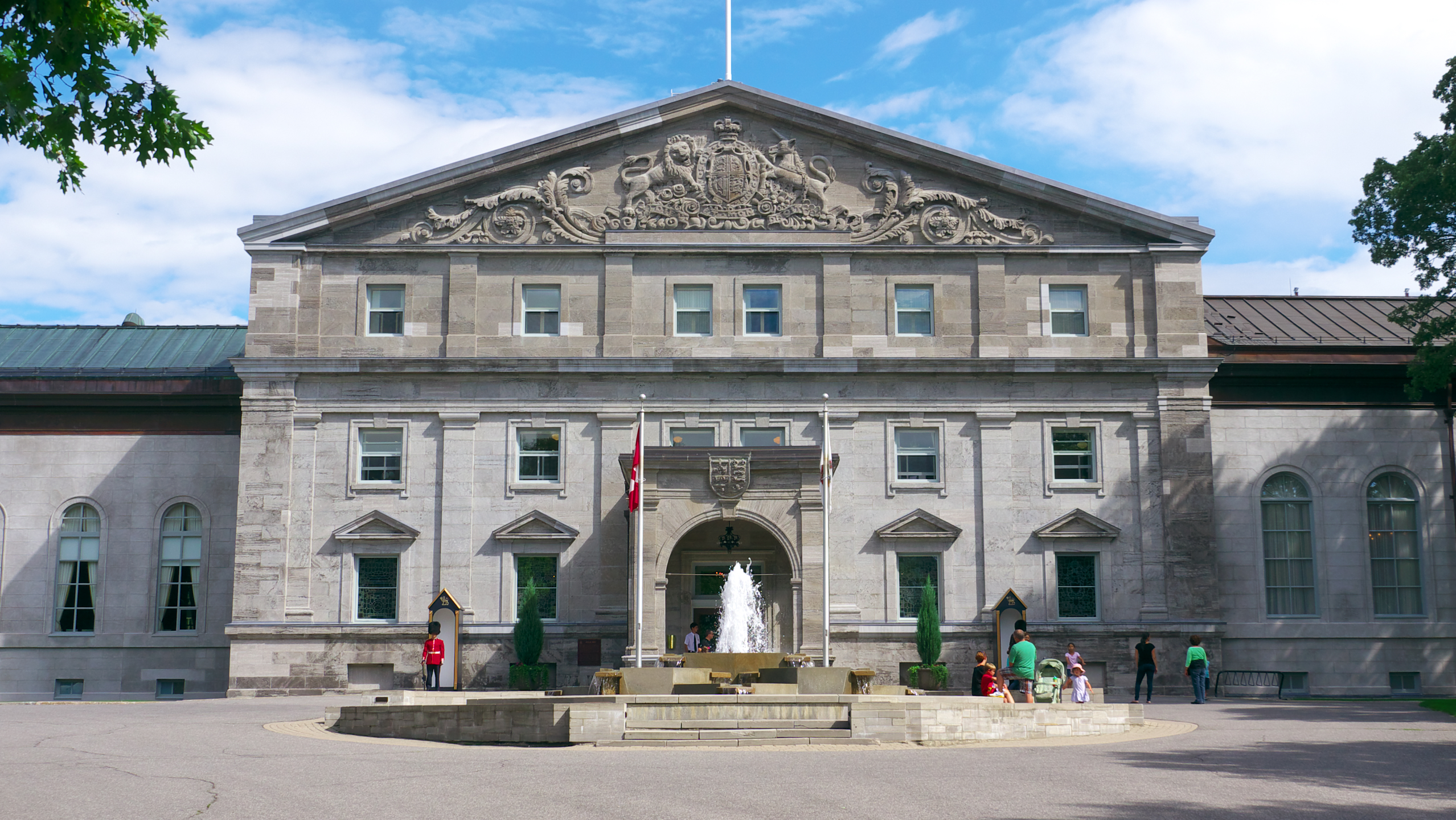
Rideau Hall, the primary residence of the governor general

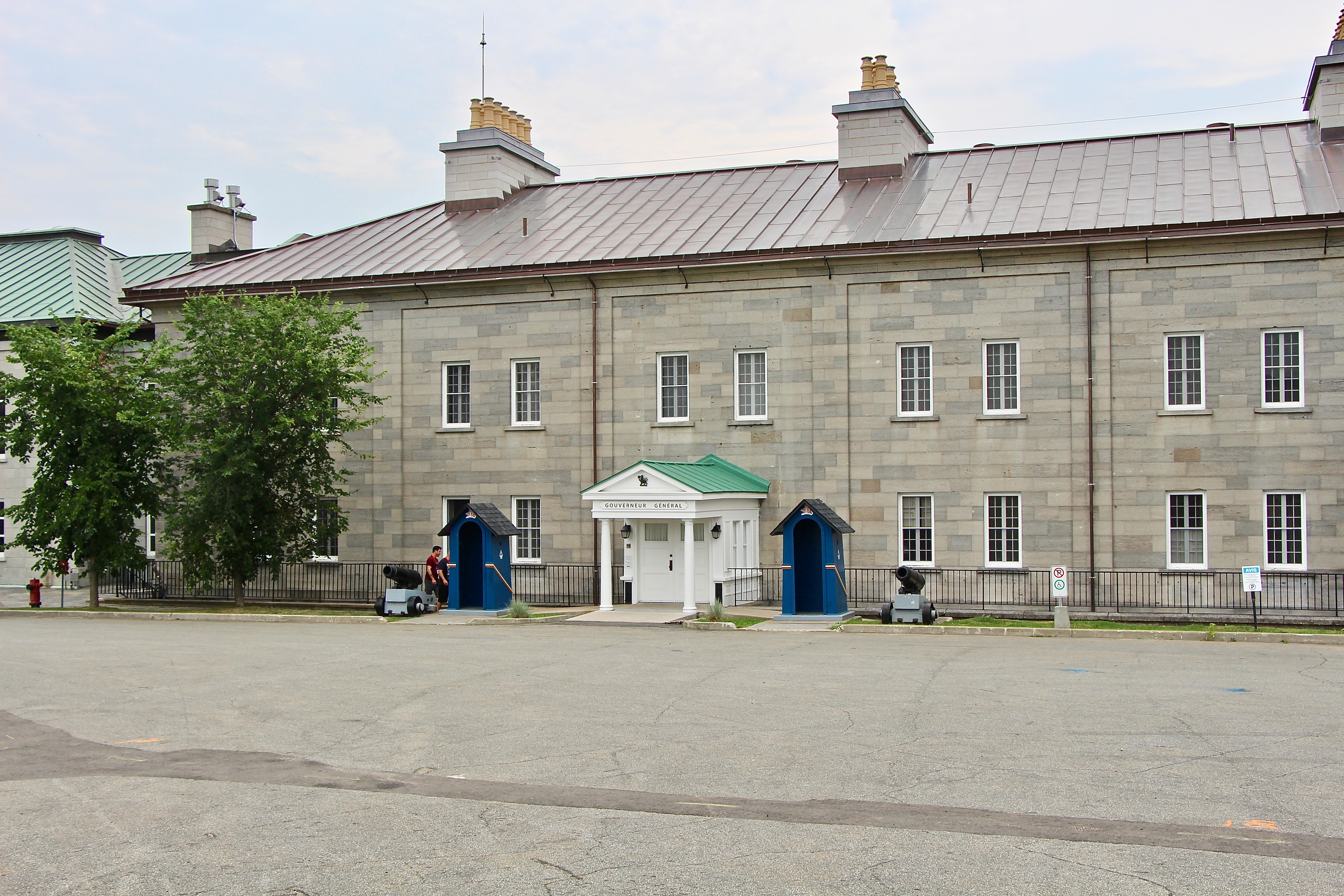
Secondary residence at the Citadelle of Quebec

The viceregal household aids the governor general in the execution of the royal constitutional and ceremonial duties and is managed by the secretary to the governor general. The Chancellery of Honours depends from the King and is thus also at Rideau Hall and administered by the governor general. As such, the viceroy's secretary ex officio holds the position of Herald Chancellor of Canada, overseeing the Canadian Heraldic Authority—the mechanism of the Canadian honours system by which armorial bearings are granted to Canadians by the governor general in the name of the sovereign. These organized offices and support systems include aides-de-camp, press officers, financial managers, speech writers, trip organizers, event planners, protocol officers, chefs and other kitchen employees, waiters, and various cleaning staff, as well as visitors' centre staff and tour guides at both official residences. In this official and bureaucratic capacity, the entire household is often referred to as Government House and its departments are funded through the normal federal budgetary process, as is the governor general's salary of CAD$288,900, which has been taxed since 2013. Additional costs are incurred from separate ministries and organizations such as the National Capital Commission, the Department of National Defence, and the Royal Canadian Mounted Police.

The governor general's air transportation is assigned to 412 Transport Squadron of the Royal Canadian Air Force. The squadron uses Bombardier Challenger 600 VIP jets to transport the governor general to locations within and outside of Canada.

== Symbols and protocol ==
As the personal representative of the monarch, the governor general follows only the sovereign in the Canadian order of precedence, preceding even other members of the royal family. Though the federal viceroy is considered primus inter pares amongst provincial counterparts, the governor general also outranks the lieutenant governors in the federal sphere; at provincial functions, however, the relevant lieutenant governor, as the King's representative in the province, precedes the governor general. The incumbent governor general and their spouse are also the only people in Canada, other than serving Canadian ambassadors and high commissioners, entitled to the use of the style His or Her Excellency and the governor general is granted the additional honorific of the Right Honourable for their time in office and for life afterwards.

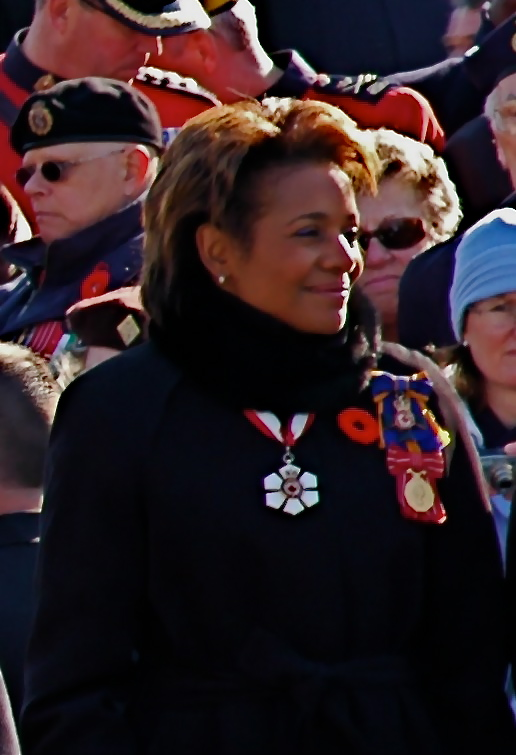
Michaëlle Jean wearing the insignia of the Order of Canada and Order of Military Merit along with the Canadian Forces' Decoration

Until 1952, all governors general of Canada were members of the peerage or heir apparent to a peerage. Typically, individuals appointed as federal viceroy were already a peer, either by inheriting the title, such as the Duke of Devonshire, or by prior elevation by the sovereign in their own right, as was the case with Earl Alexander of Tunis. None were life peers, the Life Peerages Act 1958 postdating the beginning of the tradition of appointing Canadian citizens as governor general. John Buchan was, in preparation for his appointment as governor general, made the Baron Tweedsmuir of Elsfield in the County of Oxford by King George V, six months before Buchan was sworn in as viceroy. The leader of His Majesty's Loyal Opposition at the time, Mackenzie King, felt Buchan should serve as governor general as a commoner. However, George V insisted he be represented by a peer. With the appointment of Massey as governor general in 1952, governors general ceased to be members of the peerage; successive prime ministers since that date have held to the non-binding and defeated (in 1934) principles of the 1919 Nickle Resolution.

Under the orders' constitutions, the governor general serves as Chancellor and Principal Companion of the Order of Canada, Chancellor of the Order of Military Merit, and Chancellor of the Order of Merit of the Police Forces. The governor general also upon installation automatically becomes a Knight or Dame of Justice and the Prior and Chief Officer in Canada of the Most Venerable Order of the Hospital of Saint John of Jerusalem. As acting commander-in-chief, the governor general is further routinely granted the Canadian Forces' Decoration by the chief of the Defence Staff on behalf of the monarch. All of these honours are retained following an incumbent's departure from office, with the individual remaining in the highest categories of the orders, and they may also be further distinguished with induction into other orders or the receipt of other awards. (Note: Some seven years after he left office, the Earl Alexander of Tunis was appointed as a Member of the Order of Merit. Similarly, Massey was awarded the Royal Victorian Chain by Queen Elizabeth II approximately six months after leaving the viceregal post and was in 1967 invested into the Order of Canada. ichener was presented with the Royal Victorian Chain a few months before he retired as governor general.)

The Viceregal Salute — composed of the first six bars of the Royal Anthem ("God Save the King") followed by the first and last four bars of the national anthem ("O Canada") — is the salute used to greet the governor general upon arrival and departure from most official events. To mark the viceroy's presence at any building, ship, airplane, or car in Canada, the governor general's flag is employed. The present form was adopted on 23 February 1981 and, in the federal jurisdiction, takes precedence over all other flags except for the sovereign's flag for Canada. When the governor general undertakes a state visit, however, the national flag is generally employed to mark governor general's presence. This flag is also, along with all flags on Canadian Forces property, flown at half-mast upon the death of an incumbent or former governor general.

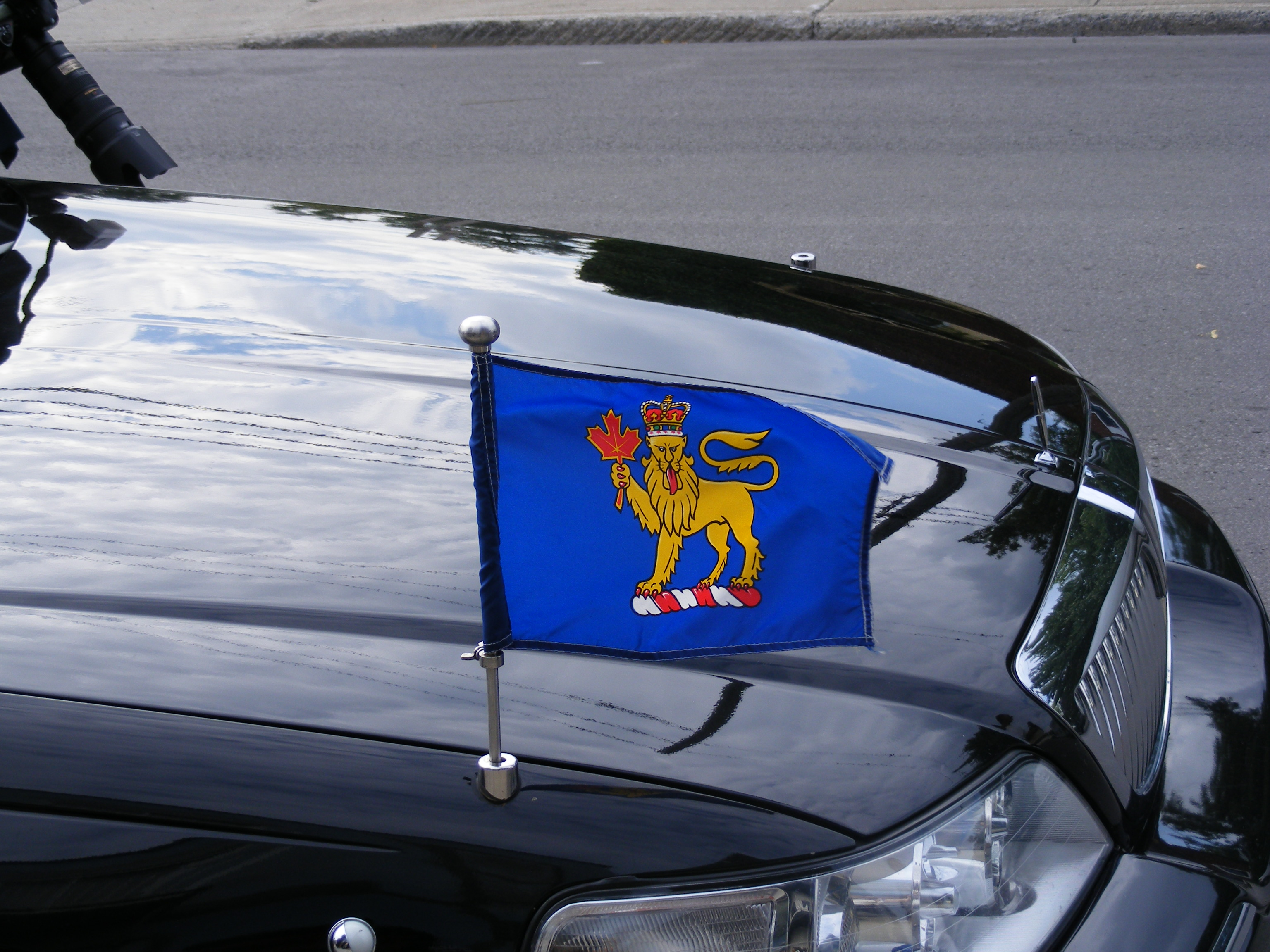
The present flag of the governor general was adopted in 1981.

The crest of the Royal Arms of Canada is employed as the badge of the governor general, appearing on the viceroy's flag and on other objects associated with the person or the office. This is the fourth such incarnation of the governor general's mark since confederation.

1901

1921

1931

1953

1981

2026

The governor general may also wear the uniform and corresponding cap or hat badge of a flag or general officer, with a special flag or general officer sleeve braid embellished with the governor general's badge, and a large embroidered governor general's badge on the shoulder straps, facing forward.

Royal Canadian Navy		Canadian Army		Royal Canadian Air Force
Board	Sleeve	Board	Sleeve	Board	Sleeve

=== French and British colonies ===
French colonization of North America began in the 1580s and Aymar Chaste was appointed in 1602 by King Henry IV as Viceroy of Canada. The explorer Samuel de Champlain became the first unofficial governor of New France in the early 17th century, (Note: Kevin MacLeod, in his book A Crown of Maples, pegs the start date of Champlain's governorship at 1627, whereas the official website of the Governor General of Canada puts it at 1608.) serving until Charles Huault de Montmagny was in 1636 formally appointed to the post by King Louis XIII. The French Company of One Hundred Associates then administered New France until King Louis XIV took control of the colony and appointed Augustin de Saffray de Mésy as the first governor general in 1663, after whom 12 more people served in the post.

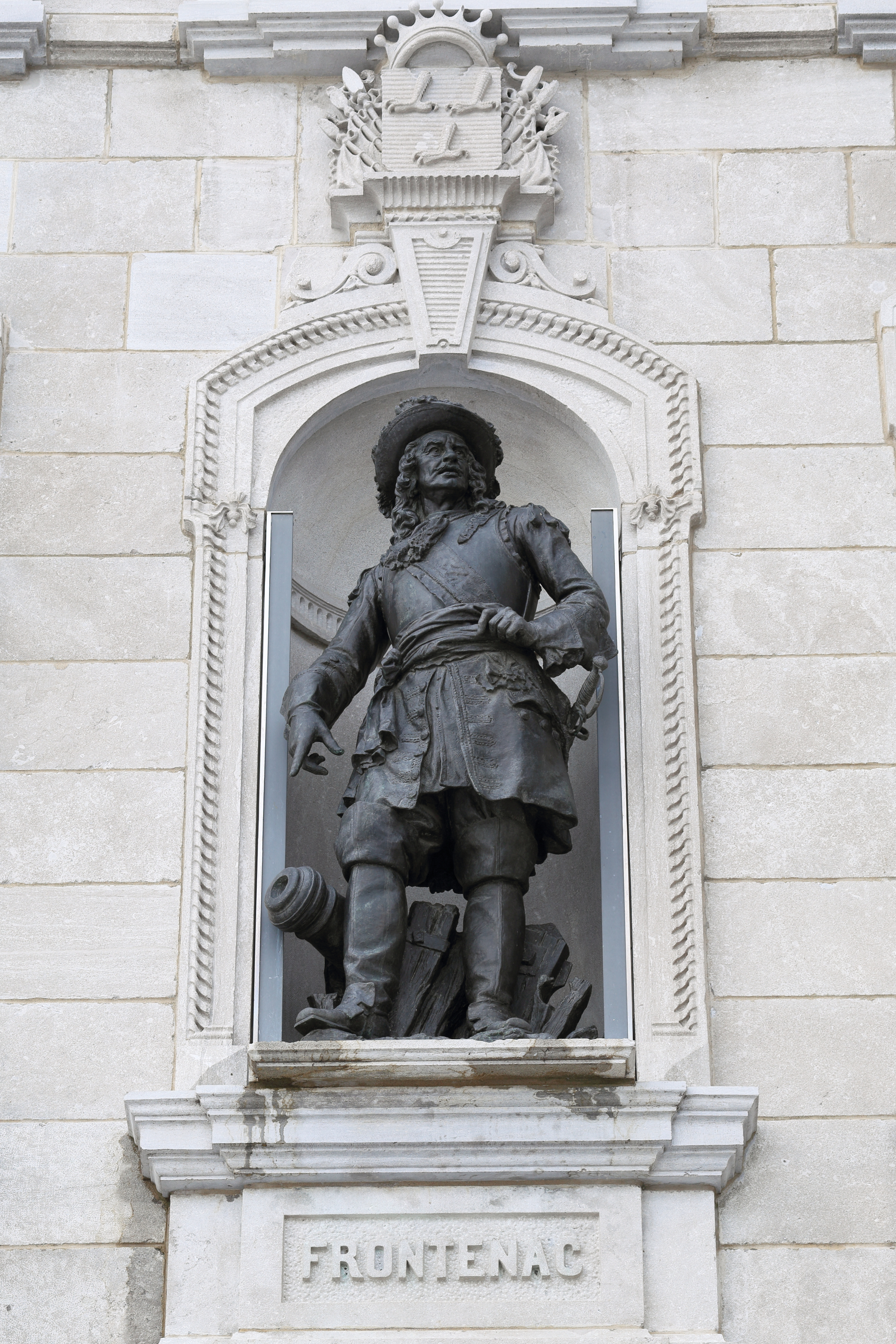
Statue of Louis de Buade de Frontenac, the third and sixth Governor General of New France, at the Quebec Parliament Building.

With the signing of the Treaty of Paris in 1763, France relinquished most of its North American territories, including Canada, to Great Britain. King George III then issued in that same year a royal proclamation establishing, amongst other regulations, the Office of the Governor of Quebec to preside over the new Province of Quebec. Nova Scotia and New Brunswick remained completely separate colonies, each with their own governor, until the cabinet of William Pitt the Younger adopted in the 1780s the idea that they, along with Quebec and Prince Edward Island, should have as their respective governors a single individual styled as governor-in-chief. The post was created in 1786, with Guy Carleton, 1st Baron Dorchester as its first occupant. However, the governor-in-chief directly governed only Quebec. It was not until the splitting in 1791 of the province of Quebec, to accommodate the influx of United Empire Loyalists fleeing the American Revolution, that the King's representative, with a change in title to Governor General, directly governed Lower Canada, while the other three colonies were each administered by a lieutenant governor in his stead.

Following the 1783 recognition of the independence of the 13 continental colonies that became the United States of America and the transfer of East Florida and West Florida to Spain, the remaining British colonies of North America, including Bermuda, were partly integrated as British North America. During the War of 1812, lieutenant-general Sir George Prevost was appointed as "Captain-General and Governor-in-Chief in and Over the Provinces of Upper-Canada, Lower-Canada, Nova-Scotia, and New-Brunswick, and Their Several Dependencies, Vice-Admiral of the Same, Lieutenant-General and Commander of all His Majesty's Forces in the Said Provinces of Lower Canada and Upper-Canada, Nova-Scotia, and New-Brunswick, and Their Several Dependencies, and in the Islands of Newfoundland, Prince Edward, Cape Breton, and the Bermudas, &c. &c. &c."

=== Responsible government ===
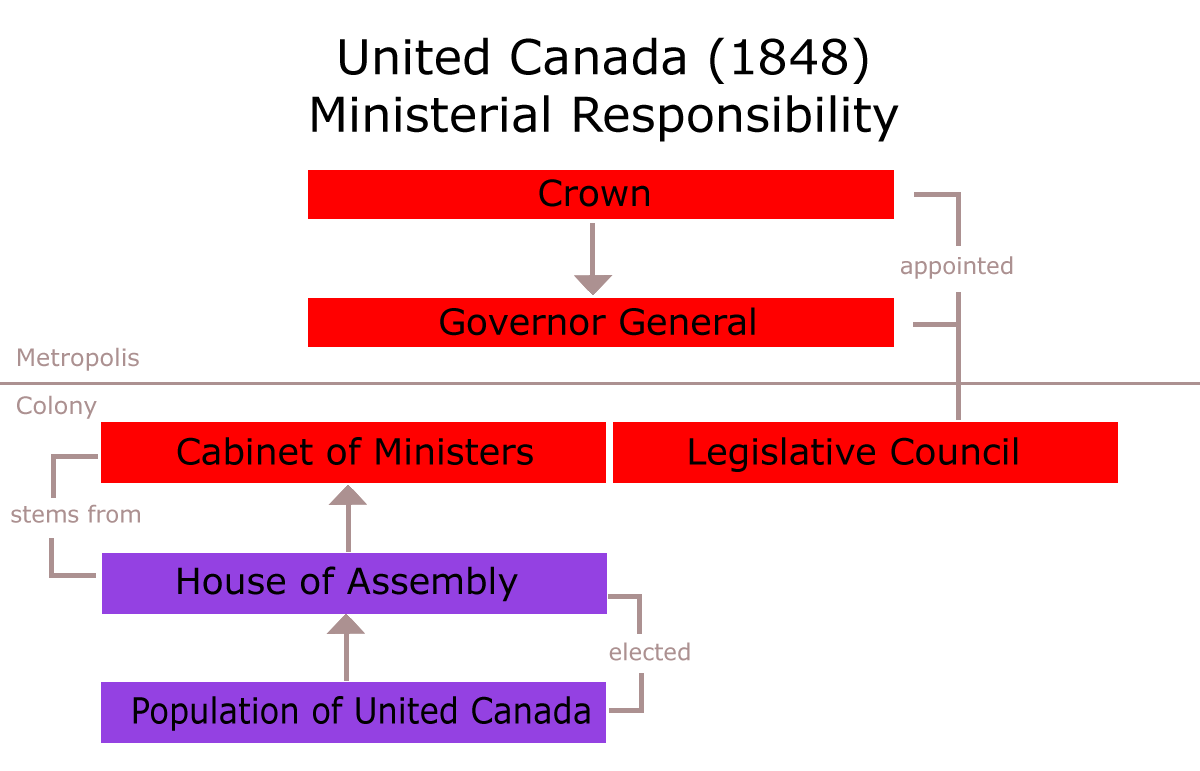
Political organization of the Province of Canada, after the introduction of responsible government under the Union Act, 1848

The Rebellions of 1837 brought about great changes to the role of the governor general, prompting, as they did, the British government to grant responsible government to the Canadian provinces. As a result, the viceroys became largely nominal heads, while the democratically elected legislatures and the premiers they supported exercised the authority belonging to the Crown; a concept first put to the test when, in 1849, Governor-General of the Province of Canada and Lieutenant-Governor of Canada East James Bruce, 8th Earl of Elgin granted Royal Assent to the Rebellion Losses Bill, despite his personal misgivings towards the legislation.

This arrangement continued after the reunification in 1840 of Upper and Lower Canada into the Province of Canada, and the establishment of the Dominion of Canada in 1867. The governor general carried out in Canada all the parliamentary and ceremonial functions of a constitutional monarch—amongst other things, granting Royal Assent, issuing Orders-in-Council, and taking advice from the Canadian Privy Council. However, the governor still remained not a viceroy, in the true sense of the word, being still a representative of and liaison to the British government—the Queen in her British council of ministers—who answered to the secretary of state for the colonies in London and who, as a British observer of Canadian politics, held well into the First World War a suite of offices in the East Block of Parliament Hill. (Note: The offices were subsequently incorporated into the Prime Minister's Office (PMO), but have been restored to their 19th century appearance after the PMO moved to the Langevin Block in the 1970s, and are now preserved as a tourist attraction along with other historic offices in the East Block.) But, the new position of Canadian high commissioner to the United Kingdom, created in 1880, began to take over the governor general's role as a link between the Canadian and British governments, leaving the viceroy increasingly as a personal representative of the monarch. As such, the governor general had to retain a sense of political neutrality; a skill that was put to the test when John Campbell, Marquess of Lorne, disagreed with his Canadian prime minister, John A. Macdonald, over the dismissal of Lieutenant Governor of Quebec Luc Letellier de St-Just. On the advice of the colonial secretary, and to avoid conflict with the Canadian Cabinet, Campbell did eventually concede and released St-Just from duty. The governor general was then in May 1891 called upon to resolve the dominion's first cabinet crisis, wherein Macdonald died, leaving Lord Stanley of Preston to select a new prime minister.

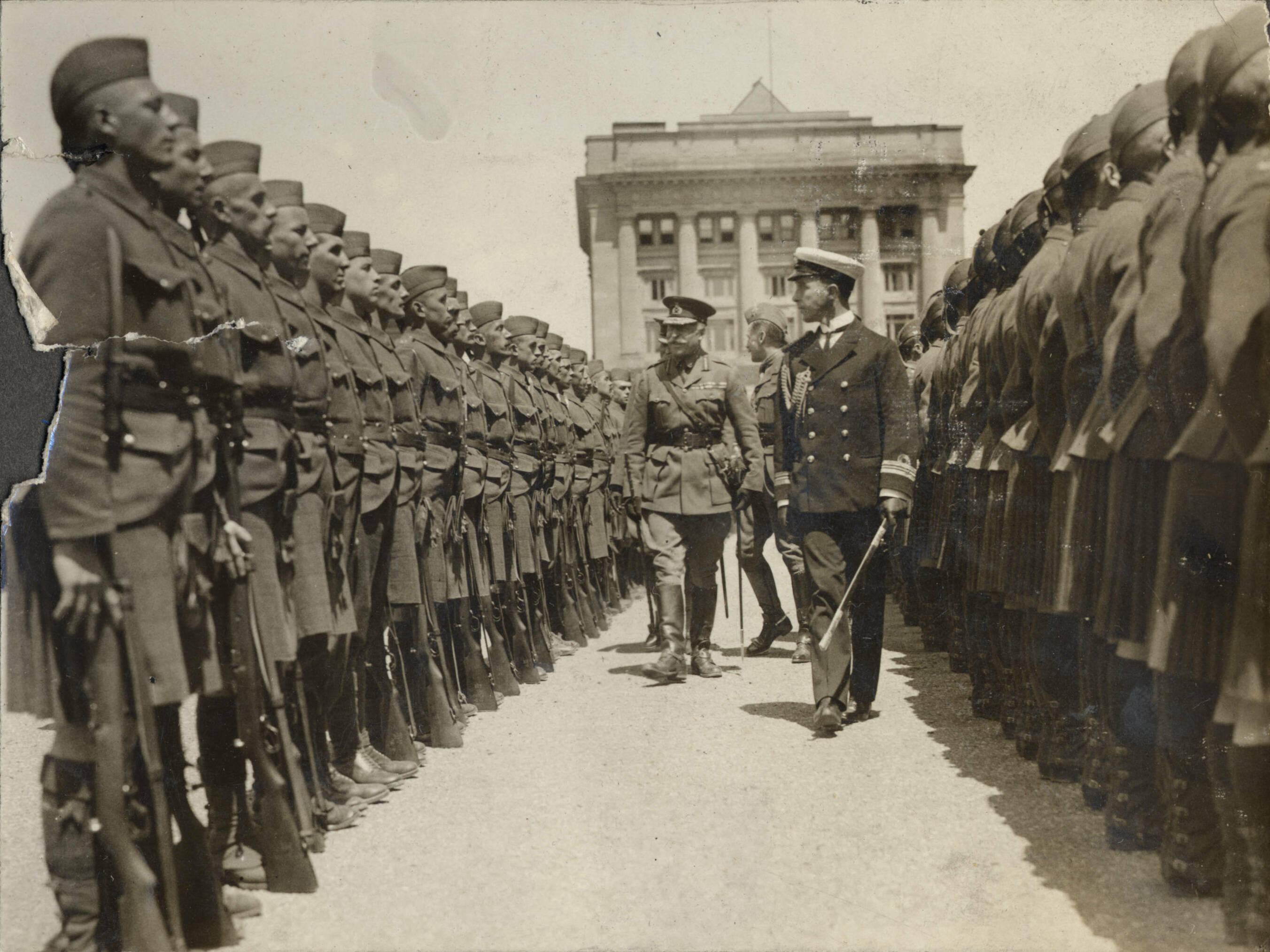
Governor General Prince Arthur inspects members of the Canadian Expeditionary Force at Valcartier Camp, 1914

As early as 1880, the viceregal family and court attracted minor ridicule from the Queen's subjects: in July of that year, someone under the pseudonym Captain Mac included in a pamphlet called Canada: from the Lakes to the Gulf, a coarse satire of an investiture ceremony at Rideau Hall, in which a retired inn-keeper and his wife undergo the rigorous protocol of the royal household and sprawl on the floor before the Duke of Argyll so as to be granted the knighthood for which they had "paid in cold, hard cash". Later, prior to the arrival of Prince Arthur, Duke of Connaught and Strathearn, to take up the post of governor general, there was a "feeble undercurrent of criticism" centring on worries about a rigid court at Rideau Hall; worries that turned out to be unfounded as the royal couple was actually more relaxed than their predecessors.

=== Emerging nationality to an independent kingdom ===
Marquess of Willingdon (left) during an official visit to Washington, D.C., as the governor general of Canada.

During the First World War, into which Canada was drawn due to its association with the United Kingdom, the governor general's role turned from one of cultural patron and state ceremony to one of military inspector and morale booster. Starting in 1914, governor general Prince Arthur donned his field marshal's uniform and put his efforts into raising contingents, inspecting army camps, and seeing troops off before their voyage to Europe. These actions, however, led to conflict with the prime minister at the time, Robert Borden; though the latter placed blame on military secretary Edward Stanton, he also opined that the Duke "laboured under the handicap of his position as a member of the Royal Family and never realized his limitations as Governor General". Prince Arthur's successor, Victor Cavendish, 9th Duke of Devonshire, faced the Conscription Crisis of 1917 and held discussions with his Canadian prime minister, as well as members of the official opposition, on the matter. Once the government implemented conscription, Devonshire, after consulting on the pulse of the nation with Sir Wilfrid Laurier, Vincent Massey, Henri Bourassa, Archbishop of Montreal Paul Bruchési, Duncan Campbell Scott, Vilhjalmur Stefansson, and Stephen Leacock, made efforts to conciliate Quebec, though he had little real success.

Canada's national sentiment had gained fortitude through the country's sacrifices on the battlefields of the First World War and, by war's end, the interference of the British government in Canadian affairs was causing ever-increasing discontent amongst Canadian officials; (Note: The appointment in 1916 of the Duke of Devonshire as governor general caused political problems, as Canadian prime minister Robert Borden had, counter to established common practice, not been consulted on the matter by his British counterpart, H. H. Asquith.) In 1918, The Toronto Star was even advocating the end of the office. The governor general's role was also changing to focus less on the larger Empire and more on uniquely Canadian affairs, (Note: During the Great Depression, the Earl of Bessborough voluntarily cut his salary by ten per cent as a sign of his solidarity with the Canadian people.) including the undertaking of official international visits on behalf of Canada, the first being that of the Marquess of Willingdon to the United States, where he was accorded by President Calvin Coolidge the full honours of representative of a head of state. (Note: Governors general had been venturing to Washington to meet informally with the President of the United States since the time of Viscount Monck.) It would be another decade, however, before the King-Byng Affair: another catalyst for change in the relationship between Canada—indeed, all the dominions—and the United Kingdom, and thus the purpose of the governor general.

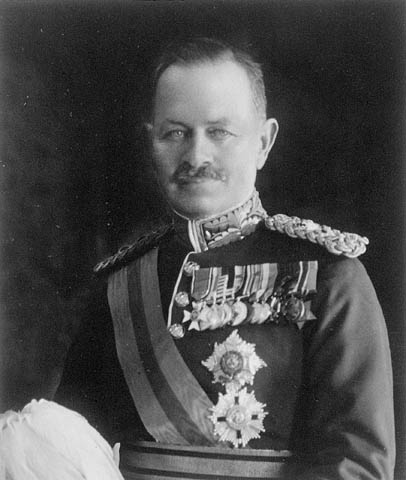
Viscount Byng of Vimy, who was involved in the King–Byng affair, a catalyst for change over the role of the governor general in the British Empire

In 1926, prime minister Mackenzie King, facing a no-confidence vote in the House of Commons over a scandal in his party, requested that governor general Byng dissolve parliament and call an election. Byng, however, refused his Canadian prime minister's advice, citing both the facts that King held the minority of seats in the house and that a general election had been held only months earlier; he thus called on Arthur Meighen to form a government. Within a week however, Meighen's Conservative government lost its own non-confidence vote, forcing the Governor General to dissolve parliament and call elections that saw Mackenzie King returned to power. King then went on to the Imperial Conference that same year and there pushed for reorganizations that resulted in the Balfour Declaration, which declared formally the practical reality that had existed for some years: namely, that the dominions were fully autonomous and equal in status to the United Kingdom. These new developments were codified in the Statute of Westminster, through the enactment of which on 11 December 1931, Canada, along with the Union of South Africa and the Irish Free State, immediately obtained formal legislative independence from the UK. In addition, the Balfour Declaration also held that the governor general would cease to act as the representative of the British government. Accordingly, in 1928, the United Kingdom appointed its first High Commissioner to Canada thus effectively ending the governor general's diplomatic role as the British government's envoy.

The governor general thus became solely the representative of the monarch within Canadian jurisdiction, ceasing completely to be an agent of the British Cabinet, (Note: The ministers in attendance at the Imperial Conference agreed that: "In our opinion it is an essential consequence of the equality of status existing among the members of the British Commonwealth of Nations that the Governor General of a Dominion is the representative of the Crown, holding in all essential respects the same position in relation to the administration of public affairs in the Dominion as is held by His Majesty the King in Great Britain, and that he is not the representative or agent of His Majesty's Government in Great Britain or of any Department of that Government.") and as such would be appointed only on the advice of his Canadian prime minister. The Canadian Cabinet's first recommendation under this new system was still, however, a British subject born outside of Canada, John Buchan (later Lord Tweedsmuir).

Tweedsmuir's birthplace aside, though, the professional author took further than any of his predecessors the idea of a distinct Canadian identity, travelling the length and breadth of the country, including, for the first time for a governor general, the Arctic regions. Not all Canadians, however, shared Tweedsmuir's views; the baron raised the ire of imperialists when he said in Montreal in 1937: "a Canadian's first loyalty is not to the British Commonwealth of Nations, but to Canada and Canada's King", a statement the Montreal Gazette dubbed as "disloyal". During Tweedsmuir's time as viceroy, which started in 1935, calls began to emerge for a Canadian-born individual to be appointed as governor general; but Tweedsmuir died suddenly in office in 1940, while Canada was in the midst of the Second World War, and Mackenzie King did not feel it was the right time to search for a suitable Canadian. The Earl of Athlone was instead appointed by King George VI, Athlone's nephew, to be his viceroy for the duration of the war.

=== Quebec nationalism and constitutional patriation ===
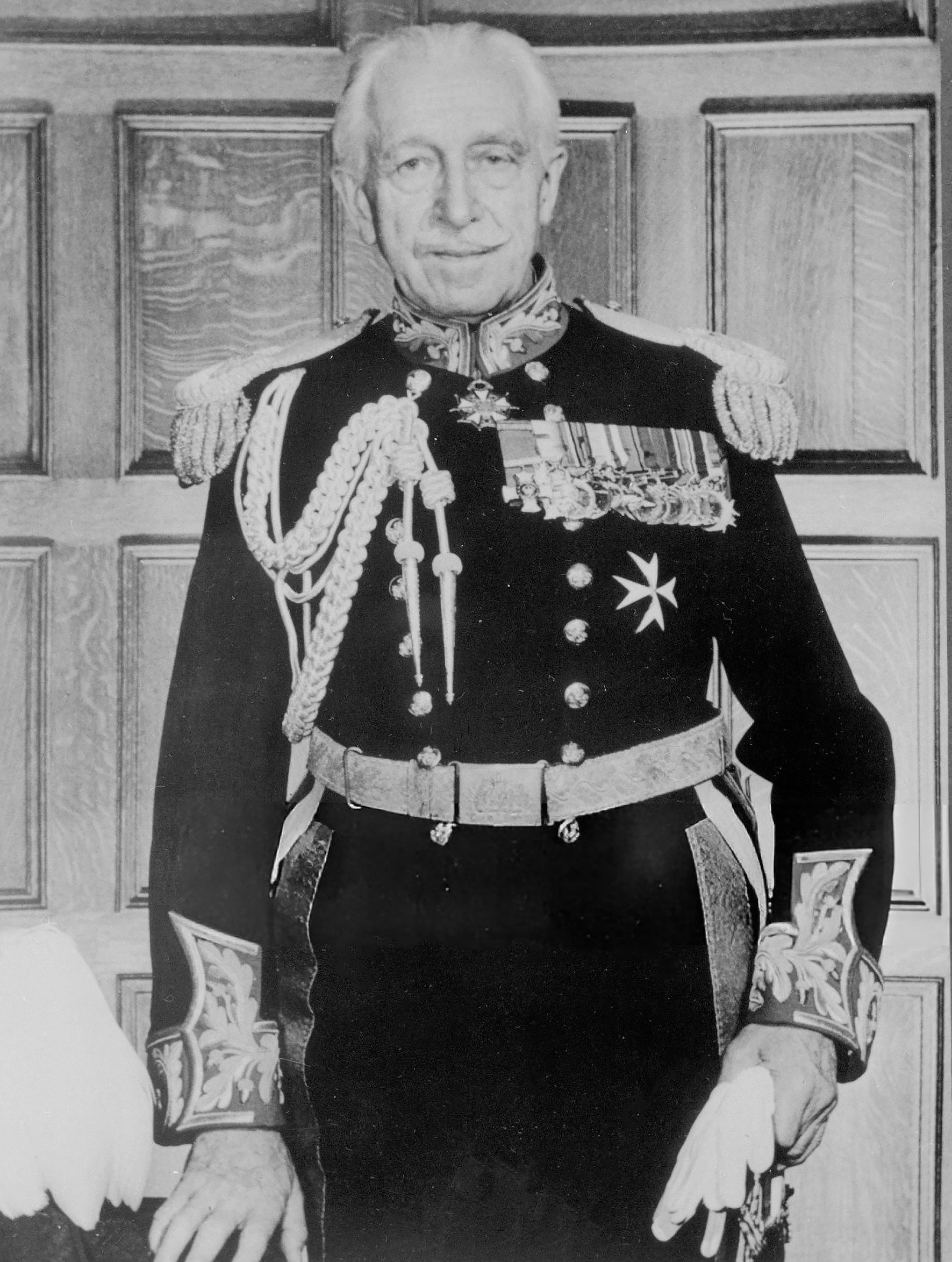
Georges Vanier, the 19th governor general of Canada. The convention of alternating between francophones and anglophones began with Vanier's appointment.

It was in 1952, a mere five days before King George VI's death, that Vincent Massey became the first Canadian-born person to be appointed as a governor-general in Canada since Sir Gordon Drummond in 1815, as well as the first not to be elevated to the peerage since Sir Edmund Walker Head in 1854. There was some trepidation about this departure from tradition and Massey was intended to be a compromise: he was known to embody loyalty, dignity, and formality, as expected from a viceroy.

As his viceregal tenure neared an end, it was thought that Massey, an anglophone, should be followed by a francophone Canadian, a first since Marquis de Vaudreuil-Cavagnal was made Governor-General of New France on 1 January 1755; and so, in spite of his Liberal Party attachments, Georges Vanier was chosen by Conservative prime minister John Diefenbaker as the next governor general. Vanier was subsequently appointed by Queen Elizabeth II, in person, at a meeting of her Canadian Cabinet, thus initiating the convention of alternating between individuals from Canada's two main linguistic groups. This move did not, however, placate those who were fostering the new Quebec nationalist movement, for whom the monarchy and other federal institutions were a target for attack. Though Vanier was a native of Quebec and fostered biculturalism, he was not immune to the barbs of the province's sovereigntists and, when he attended la Fête St-Jean-Baptiste in Montreal in 1964, a group of separatists held placards reading "Vanier vendu" ("Vanier sold out") and "Vanier fou de la Reine" ("Vanier Queen's jester").

In light of this regional nationalism and a resultant change in attitudes towards Canadian identity, images and the role of the monarchy were cautiously downplayed, and Vanier's successor, Roland Michener, was the last viceroy to practice many of the office's ancient traditions, such as the wearing of court uniform by the governor general, the requirement of court dress for state occasions, and expecting women to curtsey before the governor general. At the same time, he initiated new practices for the viceroy, including regular conferences with the lieutenant governors and the undertaking of state visits. He presided over Canada's centennial celebrations and the coincidental Expo 67, to which French president Charles de Gaulle was invited. Michener was with de Gaulle when he made his infamous "Vive le Québec libre" speech in Montreal and was cheered wildly by the gathered crowd while they booed and jeered Michener. With the additional recognition of the monarchy as a Canadian institution, the establishment of a distinct Canadian honours system, an increase of state visits coming with Canada's growing role on the world stage, and the more prevalent use of television to visually broadcast ceremonial state affairs, the governor general became more publicly active in national life.

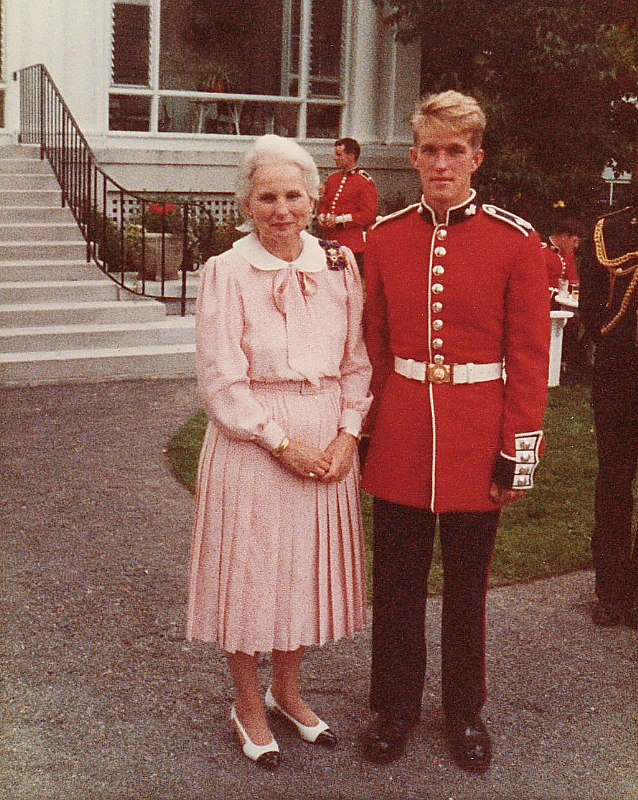
Jeanne Sauvé (left), Canada's first female governor general, with a guardsman (private) of the Canadian Grenadier Guards of Montreal

The Cabinet in June 1978 proposed the constitutional amendment Bill C-60, that, amongst other changes, vested executive authority directly in the governor general and renamed the position as First Canadian, but the proposal was thwarted by the provincial premiers. When the constitution was patriated four years later, the new amending formula for the documents outlined that any changes to the Crown, including the Office of the Governor General, would require the consent of all the provincial legislatures plus the federal parliament. By 1984, Canada's first female governor general, Jeanne Sauvé, was appointed. While it was she who created the Canadian Heraldic Authority, as permitted by letters patent from Queen Elizabeth II, and who championed youth and world peace, Sauvé proved to be a controversial vicereine, closing to the public the grounds of the Queen's residence and self-aggrandizingly breaching protocol on a number of occasions.

=== Withering and renaissance ===
Sarah Ferguson said in 2009 that sometime during her marriage to the then Prince Andrew, Duke of York (later Andrew Mountbatten-Windsor), her husband was offered the position of governor general of Canada, and she speculated in hindsight that their agreement to refuse the commission may have been a contributing factor in their eventual break-up. Instead, Sauvé's tenure as governor general was book-ended by a series of appointments—Edward Schreyer, Ray Hnatyshyn, and Roméo LeBlanc—that have been generally regarded as mere patronage postings for former politicians and friends of the incumbent prime minister at the time, (Note: LeBlanc's strong ties to the Liberal Party led other party leaders to protest his appointment by boycotting his installation ceremony.) and despite the duties they carried out, their combined time in the viceregal office is generally viewed as unremarkable at best, and damaging to the office at worst. As David Smith described it: "Notwithstanding the personal qualities of the appointees, which have often been extraordinary, the Canadian governor general has become a hermetic head of state—ignored by press, politicians and public." It was theorized by Peter Boyce that this was due, in part, to widespread misunderstanding about the governor general's role coupled with a lack of public presence compared to the media coverage dedicated to the increasingly presidentialized prime minister.

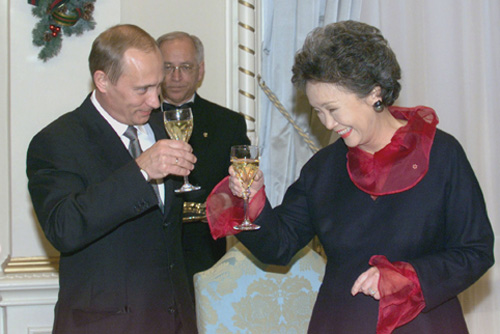
Governor General Adrienne Clarkson (right) toasts Russian president Vladimir Putin in the ballroom of Rideau Hall, 18 December 2000

It was with the Queen's appointment of Adrienne Clarkson, on the advice of prime minister Jean Chrétien, that a shift in the office took place. Clarkson was the first Canadian viceroy to have not previously held any political or military position—coming as she did from a background of television journalism with the Canadian Broadcasting Corporation—was the first since 1952 to have been born outside of Canada, the first from a visible minority (she is of Chinese ancestry), and, by her being accompanied to Rideau Hall by her husband, author and philosopher John Ralston Saul, the official appointment brought an unofficial pair to the viceregal placement, in that the governor general would not be the only person actively exploring Canadian theory and culture. Clarkson managed to bring the viceregal office back into the collective consciousness of Canadians, winning praise for touring the country more than any of her predecessors, her inspiring speeches, and her dedication to the military in her role as the commander-in-chief's representative. This did not come without a cost, however, as the attention also drew widespread criticism of the governor general's increased spending on state affairs, for which the office was symbolically rebuked by parliament when it voted in favour of cutting by 10% the viceregal budget it had earlier supported, as well as for fostering the notion, through various demonstrations, that the governor general was ultimately the Canadian head of state above the Queen herself, an approach that was said by Jack Granatstein to have caused "a fury" with the Queen on one occasion in 2004. This attitude was not unique to Clarkson, though; it had been observed that, for some decades, staff at Rideau Hall and various government departments in Ottawa had been pushing to present the governor general as head of state, part of a wider Liberal policy on the monarchy that had been in effect at least since the proposed constitutional changes in the 1970s, if not the 1964 Truncheon Saturday riot in Quebec City. Indeed, international observers opined that the viceroys had been, over the years, making deliberate attempts to distance themselves from the sovereign, for fear of being too closely associated with any "Britishness" the monarch embodied.

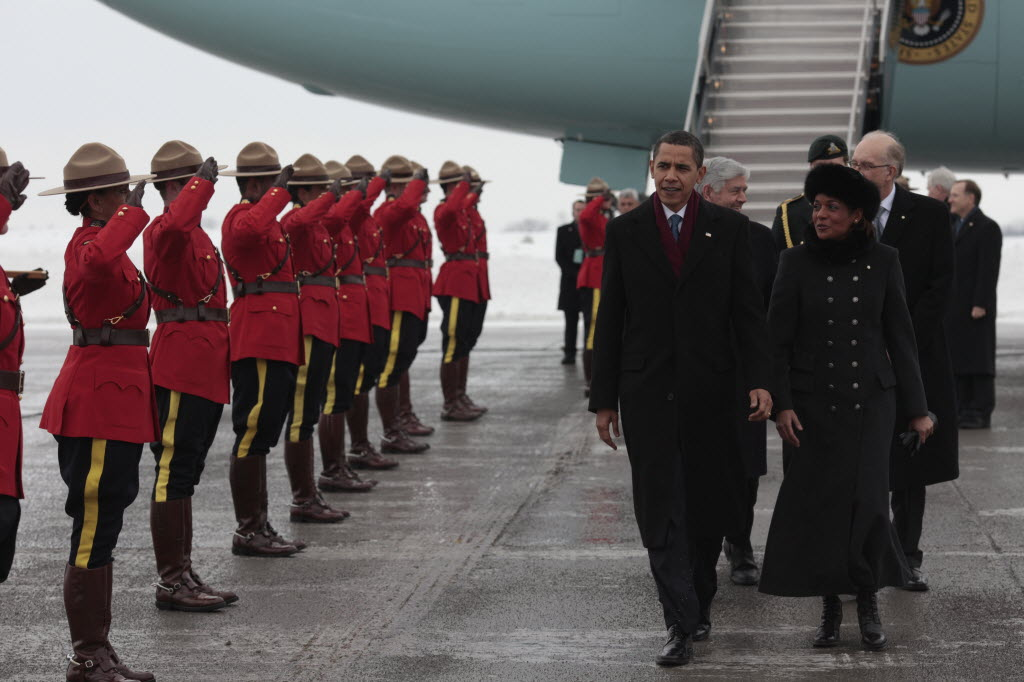
As the representative of Canada's head of state, the governor general, Michaëlle Jean, welcomes US President Barack Obama to Canada, 19 February 2009

Prime minister Paul Martin followed Chrétien's example and, for Clarkson's successor, put forward to the Queen the name of Michaëlle Jean, who was, like Clarkson, a woman, a refugee, a member of a visible minority, a CBC career journalist, and married to an intellectual husband who worked in the arts. Her appointment initially sparked accusations that she was a supporter of Quebec sovereignty, and it was observed that she had on a few occasions trodden into political matters, as well as continuing to foster the notion that the governor general had replaced the Queen as head of state, thereby "unbalancing ... the federalist symmetry". But Jean ultimately won plaudits, particularly for her solidarity with the Canadian Forces and the indigenous peoples in Canada, as well as her role in the parliamentary dispute that took place between December 2008 and January 2009.

With the appointment of academic David Johnston, former principal of McGill University and subsequently president of the University of Waterloo, there was a signalled emphasis for the governor general to vigorously promote learning and innovation. Johnston stated in his inaugural address: "[We want to be] a society that innovates, embraces its talent and uses the knowledge of each of its citizens to improve the human condition for all." There was also a recognition of Johnston's expertise in constitutional law, following the controversial prorogations of Parliament in 2008 and 2009, which initiated some debate about the governor general's role as the representative of Canada's head of state.

In late 2021, the Office of the Secretary to the Governor General confirmed its internal network was breached in a "sophisticated cyber incident". Officials were unable to determine the extent of the information that was accessed. Former security officials speculated that another country may be responsible. The Canadian Centre for Cyber Security, a branch of the Communications Security Establishment, is investigating the incident.

== Activities post-retirement ==
Retired governors general usually either withdraw from public life or go on to hold other public offices. Edward Schreyer, for instance, was appointed Canadian High Commissioner to Australia upon his departure from the viceregal role in 1984, and Michaëlle Jean became the UNESCO special envoy to Haiti and, later, the secretary-general of La Francophonie. Schreyer also become the first former governor general to run for elected office in Canada when he unsuccessfully vied for a seat in the House of Commons as a New Democratic Party candidate. Prior to 1952, several former viceroys returned to political careers in the United Kingdom, sitting with party affiliations in the House of Lords and, in some cases, taking a position in the British Cabinet. (Note: In 1952, Earl Alexander of Tunis resigned as governor general of Canada to accept an appointment as Minister of Defence in the Cabinet of Winston Churchill. Henry Petty-FitzMaurice, 5th Marquess of Lansdowne and Victor Cavendish, 9th Duke of Devonshire both also served in the British Cabinet following their viceregal careers, and Lansdowne went on to serve as leader of the Conservative Party in the House of Lords for over a decade.) The Marquess of Lorne was elected a Member of Parliament in the United Kingdom in 1895, and remained so until he became the Duke of Argyll and took his seat in the House of Lords. Others were made governors in other countries or territories: Charles Stanley Monck, 4th Viscount Monck was appointed Lord Lieutenant of Dublin, the Earl of Aberdeen was appointed Lord Lieutenant of Ireland, and the Earl of Dufferin, Henry Petty-Fitzmaurice, 5th Marquess of Lansdowne, Gilbert Elliot-Murray-Kynynmound, 4th Earl of Minto, and the Earl of Willingdon all subsequently served as Viceroy of India.

An outgoing governor general may leave an eponymous award as a legacy, such as the Stanley Cup, the Clarkson Cup, the Vanier Cup, or the Grey Cup. They may found an institution, as Vanier did with the Vanier Institute of the Family and Clarkson with the Institute for Canadian Citizenship. Three former governors general have released memoirs: Lord Tweedsmuir (Memory Hold-the-Door), Massey (What's Past is Prologue), and Clarkson (Heart Matters).

As of 2021, former governors general are entitled to a lifetime pension of nearly $150,000 and also to claim an additional $206,000 in expenses each year.

Canadian institutions established by governors general
Institution	Founded by
Royal Society of Canada	John Campbell, Marquess of Lorne
Canada's first anti-tuberculosis association	The Earl of Minto
The Battlefields Park	The Earl Grey
King George V Silver Jubilee Cancer Fund for Canada	The Earl of Bessborough
Vanier Institute of the Family	Georges Vanier
Sauvé Foundation	Jeanne Sauvé
Governor General Ramon John Hnatyshyn Education Fund	Ray Hnatyshyn
International Council for Canadian Studies	Ray Hnatyshyn
The Hnatyshyn Foundation	Ray Hnatyshyn
Institute for Canadian Citizenship	Adrienne Clarkson
Michaëlle Jean Foundation	Michaëlle Jean
Rideau Hall Foundation	David Johnston

== Spelling of the title ==
The letters patent constituting the office and official publications of the government of Canada spell the title governor general, without a hyphen, unlike in the other Commonwealth realms, which do include a hyphen. As governor is the noun, the title is pluralized as governors general, rather than governor generals.

== See also ==
- Armorial of the governors general of Canada
- Governor General's Awards
- Governor-general
- List of awards presented by the governor general of Canada
- List of governors general of Canada
- Monarchy of Canada and the Canadian Armed Forces
- Royal Canadian Air Force VIP aircraft

== Notes ==
Order of precedence
Preceded by Charles III as King of Canada	Governor General of Canada; Canadian order of precedence (ceremonial)	Succeeded by Mark Carney as Prime Minister of Canada
Political offices
Preceded by Governor General of the Province of Canada	Governor General of Canada; 1867–present	Current
