= Letters Patent, 1947 =

Canadian constitutional document

The Letters Patent, 1947 (formally, the Letters Patent Constituting the Office of Governor General and Commander-in-Chief of Canada), are letters patent signed by George VI, as King of Canada, on 8 September 1947 and came into effect on 1 October of the same year. These letters, replacing the previous letters patent issued in 1931, reconstituted the Office of the governor general of Canada under the terms of the Constitution Act, 1867, expanding the governor general's ability to exercise the royal prerogative, thereby allowing her or him to use most of the "powers and authorities" lawfully belonging to the sovereign and to carry out an increased number of the sovereign's duties in "exceptional circumstances".

While the Crown theoretically has the power to revoke or alter the letters patent at will, it remains unclear to what extent that power remains after the enactment of the Constitution Act, 1982, which requires all changes to the office of the King and the governor general to be done through a constitutional amendment approved by Parliament and all provincial legislatures.

== Historical context ==
The first letters patent in Canada were, starting in 1663, issued to the governors of New France by the kings of France. At that time, the letters patent outlining the office of the governor and its role were issued with a commission appointing the occupant to the office, as well as an accompanying set of royal instructions. In this way, a different set of letters patent were issued by the Crown each time a new governor was appointed, a custom that was continued by the British following the surrender of New France to the United Kingdom in 1763. This system remained largely unchanged until 1947, with two exceptions: The first was the granting of the title commander-in-chief in 1905 and the second occurred in 1931, under the Statute of Westminster, when the governor general went from acting as an agent of the British government (the king in his British council or parliament) to a representative of the Canadian Crown.

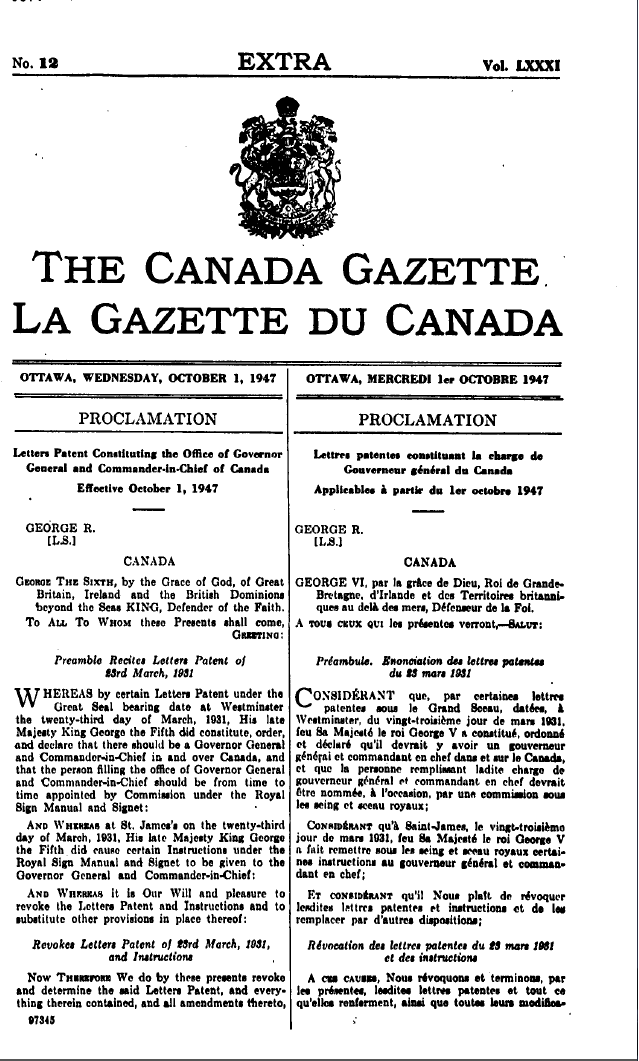
First page of the proclamation of the Letters Patent, 1947, as published in the Canada Gazette

The experiences of the Kingdom of Iceland during the Second World War also gave Prime Minister Louis St Laurent an example of how the lack of a regency act or similar mechanism could, in certain circumstances, provoke a constitutional crisis. When Denmark was invaded by Nazi Germany in 1940, Iceland found itself in the peculiar position wherein its king, Christian X, who was also king of, and resided in, Denmark, was cut off from Iceland and unable to perform his constitutional duties for that country, such as granting royal assent to bills and exercising the royal prerogative. With no method to allow for the incapacity of the sovereign, the Icelandic parliament was forced into passing a constitutional amendment appointing Sveinn Björnsson as regent.

The subject of the Canadian governor general's ability to act in the absence or incapacitation of the monarch was discussed in the House of Commons in 1947. This brought up Canada's lack of something similar to the United Kingdom's Regency Act, which further underscored the need for such a mechanism within the Canadian political structure. As a result, the 1947 letters patent were issued by King George VI later that year, allowing the governor general to carry out nearly all of the sovereign's duties in case of the monarch's capture or incapacity and, thus, negating the need for His Majesty's Canadian government to go through the process of passing legislation equivalent to the Regency Act.

== Implementation ==
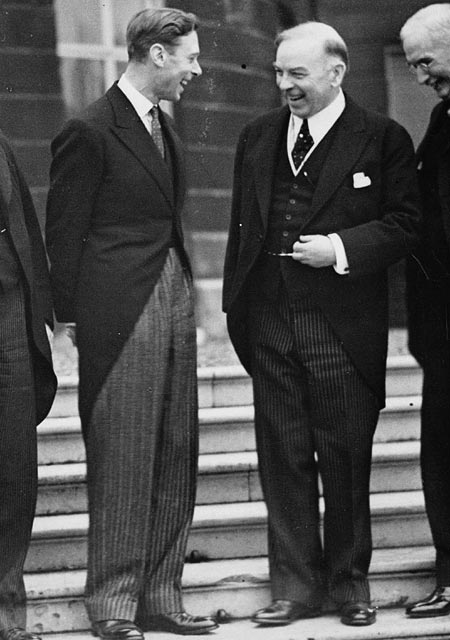
George VI, King of Canada (left), with Prime Minister of Canada William Lyon Mackenzie King (right), 1937

The intent behind the Letters Patent, 1947, was to re-draft the 1931 letters patent into a uniquely Canadian document empowering the governor general by way of "enabling legislation". At the time, it was remarked that "there seems to be no change in the status of governor general" and that the governor general "still remains an officer to whom His Majesty has committed extensive but definite powers and functions." Prime Minister Mackenzie King wrote to the King, stating that, "unless exceptional circumstances made it necessary to do so, it was not proposed by the Canadian government to alter existing practices without prior consultation or notification to the governor general and the King". Consequently, despite the permissions in the Letters Patent, 1947, there is no legal impediment to the King exercising any of his powers himself; the Canadian sovereign continues to wield "[his] prerogative powers in relation to Canada concurrently with the governor general." As a matter of law, the governor general of Canada is not in the same constitutional position as the sovereign. Even many years after the implementation of the letters patent, a variety of matters continue to be submitted exclusively to the sovereign, such as the creation of honours, the appointment of governors general, and authorizing declarations of war. Other matters, such as the approval of Canadian ambassadors to and from foreign countries and the signing of treaties, have since been delegated entirely to the governor general.

Unlike other parts of the constitution, the letters patent are a creation of the monarch's royal prerogative and cannot be repealed by Parliament. Conversely, the Letters Patent, 1947, would not be sufficient to effect such a dramatic change as a transfer of power from the King to the governor general, as any changes to the role of both of these positions are subject to the amending formula provided in section 41 of the Constitution Act, 1982, which requires alterations to the office of the King and the governor general be done through a constitutional amendment approved by Parliament and all the provincial legislatures. For example, the permission in the letters patent for the governor general to exercise the role of commander-in-chief cannot be construed as an abdication of this duty by the king, as the position is constitutionally vested in the monarch and any changes to that arrangement would require an amendment of section 15 of the Constitution Act, 1867.

No procedural obstacle would prevent the Monarch from repealing, replacing or amending the 1947 Letters Patent. However, the Constitution Act 1982 requires the unanimous consent of the Canadian parliament and provincial legislative assemblies to make changes to the constitutional status of the monarchy; the necessary level of approval for amendments to the Letters Patent is currently unclear, but would likely be decided by the Supreme Court of Canada.

== Impact ==
While the role of the governor general is largely considered a ceremonial one, the powers of the Crown that the Letters Patent, 1947, permitted the Office of the Governor General to use are substantial. Increased attention is sometimes brought to these powers by political events, such as the 2008 and 2009 prorogations of the federal Parliament, which serve to increasingly highlight the role that the governor general plays within the Canadian constitution. Even though the monarch's permission to use the powers put the governor general "not in quite the same position as the sovereign in regard to the exercise of certain prerogative powers", the 1947 letters patent serve to allow the Canadian political system a greater amount of flexibility in the exercise of the Canadian Crown's powers.

== Transfer of powers or misconception ==
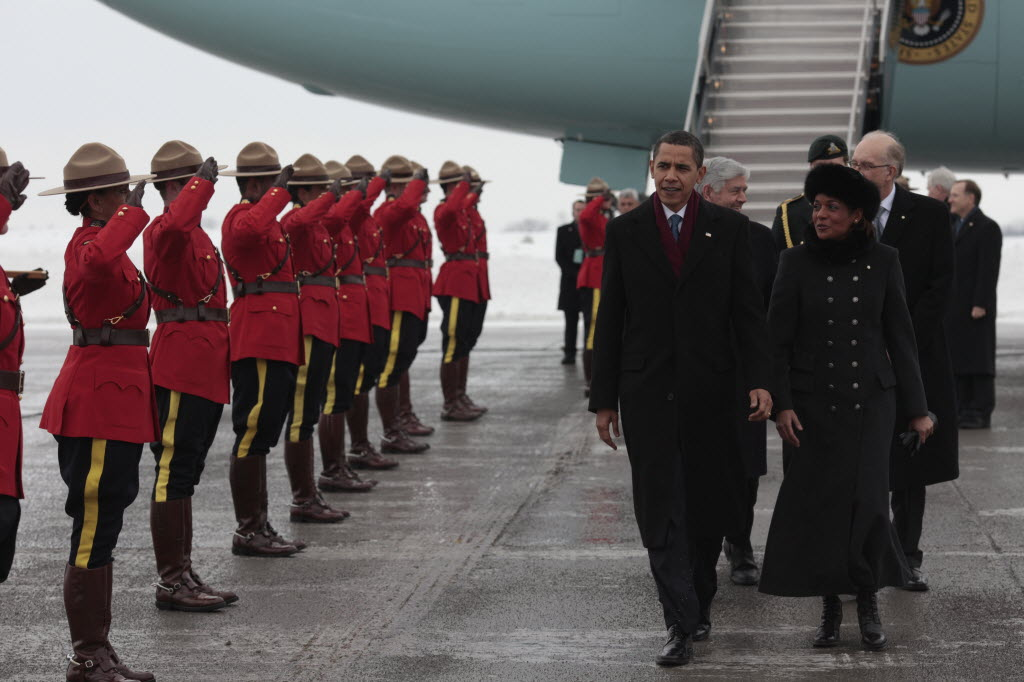
Then-Governor General Michaëlle Jean (right) welcoming US President Barack Obama (left) at the start of his official visit to Canada, February 2009

The letters patent of 1947 have been misconstrued as effecting a transfer of all the powers of the Crown to the governor general and, thus, putting the governor general in a position equal to that of the King. Even former governors general have failed to grasp the essence of the letters patent. Former Governor General Adrienne Clarkson expressed in her memoirs that, "many politicians don't seem to know that the final authority of the state was transferred from the monarch to the governor general in the letters patent of 1947", a statement determined to be "nonsense on Clarkson’s part" and where her referring to herself as a "head of state" simply reinforced her "misunderstanding of the letters patent." In 2009, Michaëlle Jean also stated that she was Canada's head of state, which led to a rare public rebuke from the Prime Minister of Canada, Stephen Harper, who stated "categorically" that Queen Elizabeth II was Canada's head of state and that the governor general served as the Queen's representative in Canada. It is apparent from political correspondence of the time that it was never the belief of the government that such powers had ever been transferred. In addition, the tabling, in 1978, of Bill C-60, which moved to legally transfer the powers exercised by the Queen to the governor general, would have been completely redundant if such a transfer had already occurred 31 years previous.
