= Peter Rosenthal =

Canadian mathematician and lawyer (1941–2024)

Peter Michael Rosenthal
- Born: June 1, 1941; New York City, U.S.
- Died: May 25, 2024 (aged 82); Toronto, Ontario, Canada
- Resting place: Beth Tzedec Memorial Park, Toronto, Canada
- Citizenship: Canadian; American
- Occupations: Mathematician, lawyer
- Spouses: Helen Stephanie Black (m. 1960; div. 1979) Carol Kitai (m. 1985)
- Children: Alan Rosenthal, Jeffrey S. Rosenthal, Michael Rosenthal, Daniel Kitai Rosenthal, Esther Kitai Rosenthal
- Parent(s): Harold Rosenthal; Esther (Posner) Rosenthal

Academic background
- Education: Queens College, CUNY (BS); University of Michigan (PhD); University of Toronto (LLB)
- Thesis: On Latices of Invariant Subspaces (1967)
- Doctoral advisor: Paul Halmos

Peter Michael Rosenthal (June 1, 1941 – May 25, 2024) was an American-Canadian mathematician, lawyer, and activist who was Professor of Mathematics at the University of Toronto, and an adjunct professor of law at the University of Toronto Law School.

== Early life and family ==
Rosenthal grew up in a Jewish family in Flushing, Queens, New York with his parents, Harold (1913–1983) and Esther (1914–1985), and two younger brothers, Erik and Walter. Rosenthal described himself as a "red diaper baby". His father was a high school math teacher and his mother was a left-wing activist who had been a member of the Communist Party in her youth.

His maternal grandmother, Sonia, had immigrated to New York from Russia after the failed 1905 Russian Revolution and was a supporter of the Bolsheviks.

Rosenthal himself was also a committed activist and in 1960 participated in protests at the Woolworth's in Flushing in solidarity with the sit-ins at Woolworth's in Greensboro, North Carolina protesting racial segregation.

Rosenthal had poor grades in high school and barely graduated, but after nearly failing in college due to the time he spent attending civil rights and anti-nuclear protests, he began to focus on his studies at Queens College, excelling in math.

Erik Rosenthal is an emeritus professor of mathematics at the University of New Haven. Their youngest brother, Walter (Wally) Rosenthal, is a community activist and trade unionist in New York City who taught at York College after retiring from the United States Postal Service. Both Erik and Wally were civil rights and anti-war activists in the 1960s.

== Mathematics career ==
Rosenthal graduated from Queens College, City University of New York with a B.S. in mathematics in 1962. In 1963 he obtained an MA in Mathematics and in 1967 a Ph.D. in mathematics from the University of Michigan; his Ph.D. thesis advisor was Paul Halmos. His thesis, "On lattices of invariant subspaces" concerns operators on Hilbert space, and most of his subsequent research was in operator theory and related fields. Much of his work was related to the invariant subspace problem, the still-unsolved problem of the existence of invariant subspaces for bounded linear operators on Hilbert space. He made substantial contributions to the development of reflexive and reductive operator algebras and to the study of lattices of invariant subspaces, composition operators on the Hardy-Hilbert space and linear operator equations. His publications include many with his long-time collaborator Heydar Radjavi, including the book Invariant Subspaces (Springer-Verlag, 1973; second edition 2003).

In 1967, Rosenthal moved to Canada to accept an assistant professorship at the University of Toronto where he remained for the rest of his career, eventually becoming a full professor and retiring as a professor emeritus.

Rosenthal supervised the Ph.D. theses of fifteen students and the research work of a number of post-doctoral fellows.

== Legal career ==
In parallel with his career in mathematics, Rosenthal pursued a career in law. While teaching at the University of Toronto in 1969, Rosenthal was arrested while giving a speech at an anti-Vietnam War demonstration outside of the US consulate in Toronto. Representing himself in court, he was acquitted of obstructing police but convicted of causing a disturbance, but was able to have his conviction overturned on appeal. With his newfound interest in the law, Rosenthal began volunteering as a paralegal representing friends and activists who had been arrested and charged with minor criminal offences at protests or for civil disobedience or other activist-related offences, particularly related to civil rights or anti-racist activity. Rosenthal was threatened by the Law Society of Upper Canada for practicing law without a license and he hired Charles Roach to represent him before the law society. The law society abandoned its action after Roach moved a motion to move the disciplinary proceeding to court.

In the 1980s, Rosenthal worked with Roach representing 21 peace activists who had been charged in relation to protests against Litton Industries and their work on manufacturing components for cruise missiles, with Rosenthal arguing that Litton executives were endangering the safety of Canadians through its products. Rosenthal was also involved in a campaign to protest an invitation to South Africa ambassador Glenn Babb to speak at the University of Toronto in defence of South African's apartheid regime. Rosenthal was one of four University of Toronto professors who sought an injunction to stop Babb along with a declaration by the court that apartheid was a crime against humanity. While this effort was unsuccessful it helped lead to a later decision by the university to divest from South Africa.

Roach encouraged Rosenthal to go to law school so that he could represent clients in more serious cases, and he was admitted to University of Toronto Law School in 1987 at the age of 46. He went on to obtain an LL.B. in 1990 and was called to the Ontario bar in 1992. Rosenthal joined Roach's firm as a partner.

He was a major figure in the Toronto legal community, and was profiled by Toronto Life, The Globe and Mail, and the Toronto Star In 2006, Now Magazine named Rosenthal Toronto's "Best activist lawyer". In May 2016, he was awarded a Law Society Medal by the Law Society of Upper Canada.

Rosenthal provided legal services for various leftist causes and marginalized clients for free. He was also active in civil law suing police and public officials, and participated in inquests into the police shootings of several Black men, representing the families of the deceased.

Rosenthal represented Miguel Figueroa, the leader of the Communist Party of Canada, in the case Figueroa v. Canada before the Supreme Court of Canada. The court ruled in Figueroa's favor, striking down a law that prohibited small political parties from obtaining the same tax benefits as large parties.

Rosenthal represented many activists who faced charges as a result of political protests, including Shawn Brant, John Clarke and the Ontario Coalition Against Poverty, Vicki Monague of Stop Dump Site 41, Dudley Laws and the Black Action Defence Committee, and Jaggi Singh and others arrested at the 2010 G20 Toronto summit protests, and wrote articles about some of those cases. In 2006, Rosenthal represented Indigenous activists at the Ipperwash Crisis and cross-examined former Premier of Ontario Mike Harris over allegedly saying ""I want the fucking Indians out of the park."

== Personal life and death ==
Rosenthal married his first wife, Helen Black (1942–2017), in 1960 when he was 19 and she was 18. Both of them were social activists and would become mathematicians at the University of Toronto. They divorced in 1979, but remained friends. Rosenthal married his second wife, Carol Kitai, a medical doctor, in 1985.

Rosenthal was a lifelong Marxist and political activist. He was a red diaper baby; his mother was active in the civil rights and anti-war movements. Rosenthal told the Globe and Mail: "I regard myself as a Marxist, but not one affiliated with any particular parties... I have a very strong hatred of racism and the grotesque economic inequalities such as exist in the world. It is very deeply embedded in my bones."

Rosenthal died in Toronto on May 25, 2024, at the age of 82. He had suffered from heart disease and Parkinson’s disease, and died due to complications from COVID-19.

The song "A Little Rain (A Song for Pete)" (2016), by the alternative rock band the Arkells, was inspired by Rosenthal. It was written by Arkells' lead singer Max Kerman, a friend of Rosenthal and his family.

== Works ==
- Radjavi, Heydar; Rosenthal, Peter (1973), Invariant Subspaces, Springer, MR 0367682, 2nd edition MR 2003221
- Radjavi, Heydar; Rosenthal, Peter (2000), Simultaneous Triangularization, Springer, ISBN 978-0-387-98466-7
- Martinez-Avendano, Ruben; Rosenthal, Peter (2006), An Introduction to Operators on the Hardy-Hilbert Space, Springer, ISBN 978-0-387-35418-7
- (with Sheldon Axler and Donald Sarason) editors. A Glimpse at Hilbert Space Operators, Birkhäuser, 2010.
- Rosenthal, Daniel; Rosenthal, David; Rosenthal, Peter (2014), A Readable Introduction to Real Mathematics, Springer, ISBN 978-3-319-05654-8, MR 3235953
