= Oath of Allegiance (Canada) =

Promise of fealty to the Canadian monarch

Peter MacKay (left) reciting the Oath of Allegiance, as administered by Kevin G. Lynch (right), Clerk of the Privy Council, and in the presence of Governor General Michaëlle Jean (seated, centre), at Rideau Hall, 14 August 2007

The Canadian Oath of Allegiance is a promise or declaration of fealty to the Canadian monarch taken, along with other specific oaths of office, by new occupants of various federal and provincial government offices; members of federal, provincial, and municipal police forces; members of the Canadian Armed Forces; and, in some provinces, all lawyers upon admission to the bar. The Oath of Allegiance also makes up the first portion of the Oath of Citizenship, the taking of which is a requirement of obtaining Canadian nationality.

The vow's roots lie in the oath taken in the United Kingdom, the modern form of which was implemented in 1689 by King William II and III and Queen Mary II and was used in Canada prior to Confederation. The Canadian oath was established at that time in the British North America Act, 1867 (now Constitution Act, 1867).

== Composition ==
The present form of the Oath of Allegiance, which derives from that which was, and still is, taken by parliamentarians in the United Kingdom, is:

I, [name], do swear that I will be faithful and bear true allegiance to His Majesty King Charles the Third, King of Canada, his heirs and successors. So help me God.

— Oaths of Allegiance Act, R.S.C., 1985, c. O-1, s. 2

A person may choose to replace the word swear with solemnly affirm and to omit the phrase so help me God. The oath taker is also given the option of either swearing on a holy book or not.

The oath for senators and members of Parliament has stood the same since Confederation; according to Section IX.128 of the Constitution Act, 1867: "Every member of the Senate and the House of Commons of Canada shall, before taking his seat therein, take and subscribe before the governor general, or some person authorized by him, and every member of a legislative council or legislative assembly of any province shall, before the lieutenant governor of the province, or some person authorized by him, the Oath of Allegiance contained in the Fifth Schedule to the act." The oath set out in said schedule is, "I, [name], do swear, that I will be faithful and bear true allegiance to Her Majesty Queen Victoria", with the further instruction that "the name of the king or queen of the United Kingdom of Great Britain and Ireland for the time being is to be substituted from time to time, with proper terms of reference thereto." (Note: The Constitution Act, 1867, has not been amended to reflect the changes both in the name of the United Kingdom and in the status of Canadian sovereignty from that country; see Monarchy of Canada § International and domestic aspects.) The oath thus currently reads as follows:

I, [name], do swear, that I will be faithful and bear true allegiance to His Majesty King Charles III.

— Constitution Act, 1867, 30 & 31 Vict. c. 3, The Fifth Schedule

In French, this is:

Je, [nom], jure que je serai fidèle et porterai une vraie allégeance à Sa Majesté le Roi Charles III.

— French Constitutional Drafting Committee (1990), Loi constitutionnelle de 1867, Annexe V

For those parliamentarians whose religion prohibits the swearing of oaths, there exists a compromise affirmation, first instituted in 1905:

I, [name], do solemnly, sincerely and truly affirm and declare the taking of an oath is according to my religious belief unlawful, and I do also solemnly, sincerely and truly affirm and declare that I will be faithful and bear true allegiance to His Majesty King Charles III.

— Parliament of Canada Act, R.S.C., 1985, c. P-1, Schedule

== Purpose ==
The Oath of Allegiance was implemented to acknowledge the supremacy of the reigning monarch of Canada; allegiance is to the "natural person of the king [or queen, as the case may be]", but, it is to them as the personification of the Canadian state. Professor Yan Campagnolo stated, "an oath to the King is not an oath to the person who wears the Crown at a given time; rather, it is an oath to an institution that symbolizes our system of government, a democratic constitutional monarchy. An oath to the King is therefore an oath to our system of government and homeland, not an oath to a foreign monarch." Along that line, in the military context, specifically, the King is the highest authority in the Canadian Armed Forces. The giving of faithfulness to the monarch in that way is a manifestation of a key responsibility central to the Canadian system of government and serves to "remind individuals taking it of the serious obligations and responsibilities that he or she is assuming."

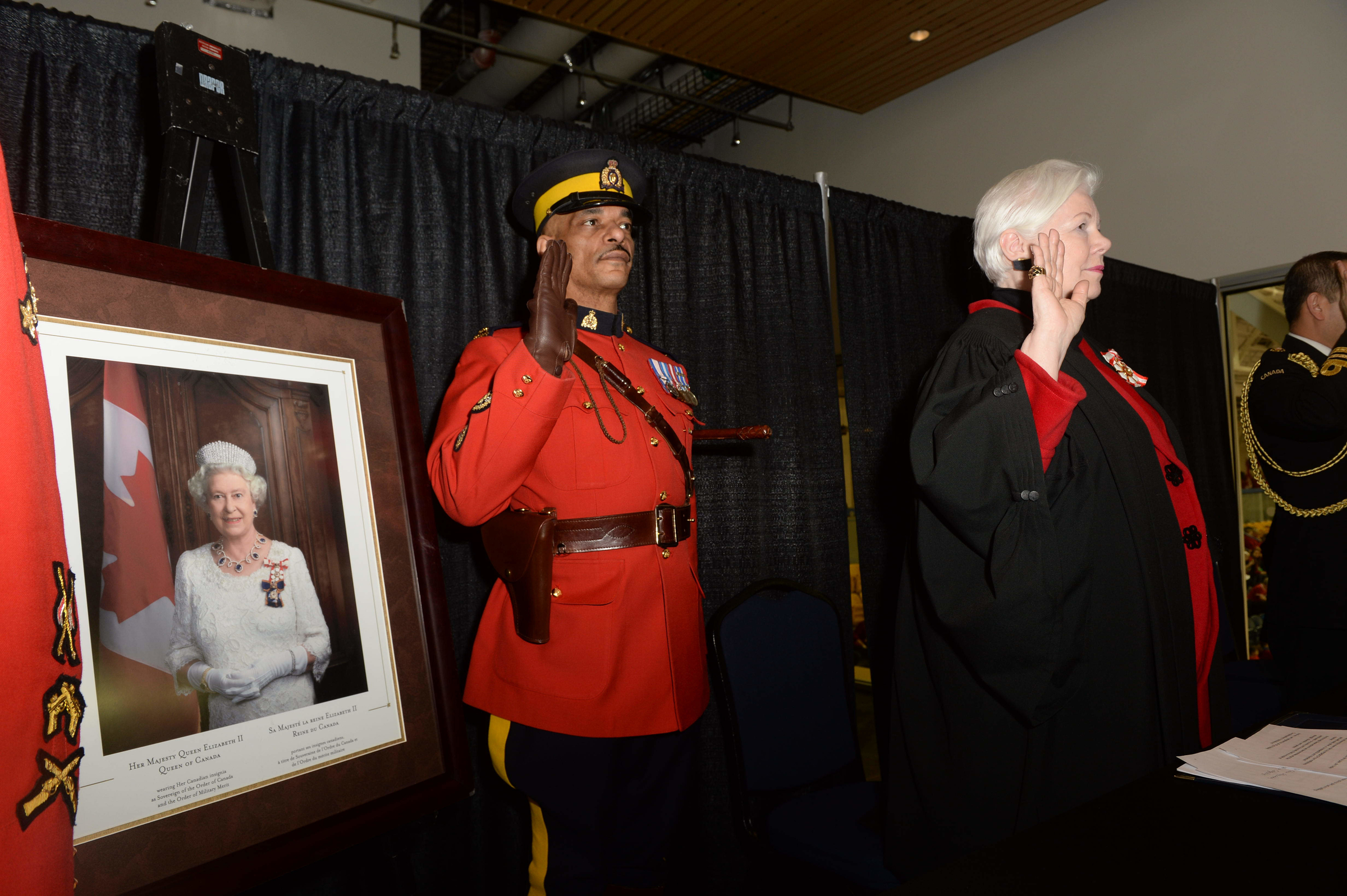
Photo portrait of Elizabeth II, Queen of Canada, at the front of a citizenship ceremony, wherein the Oath of Citizenship is recited, which includes the Oath of Allegiance

Mike Harris, later Premier of Ontario, said in 1993 that "the oath to the Queen is fundamental to the administration of the law in this country. It signifies that, here in Canada, justice is done—not in the name of the prime minister, or the mayor, or the police chief, as in totalitarian nations—but by the people, in the name of the Queen," while James Robertson stated that the oath was the way elected members of Parliament—who are assuming positions of public trust—promise to carry out their duties "patriotically and in the best interests of the country." The Federal Court also expressed that giving allegiance to the sovereign was "a solemn intention to adhere to the symbolic keystone of the Canadian constitution, thus pledging an acceptance of the whole of our constitution and national life," though, also reflecting, "it may be argued that it strikes at the very heart of democracy to curtail collective opposition and incentive for change by demanding loyalty to a particular political theory."

The relationship between the oath taker and the monarch is a complex one, with roots reaching back to historical periods when a monarch ruled and accepted an oath of fealty from his or her subjects. The modern oath remains both fiduciary and reciprocal; mirroring citizens' oaths to the monarch, the sovereign takes the Coronation Oath, wherein he or she promises "to govern the peoples of [...] Canada [...] according to their respective laws and customs." It has been said of this mutual verbal contract, "except through the person of the Queen, Canada cannot take an oath to Canadians in return. It doesn't exist in the sense that it can take an oath. It is fundamental to our tradition of law and freedom that the commitments made by the people are reciprocated by the state. Reciprocal oaths are essential to our Canadian concept of government." For members of the Canadian Armed Forces, the oath to the monarch is "the soldier's code of moral obligation."

The oath sworn by lawyers in Alberta includes the phrasing, "I will uphold and maintain the sovereign's interest and that of my fellow citizens, according to the law in force in Alberta." The sovereign's interests entail a broad field of liberty for the monarch's subjects.

== Taking the oath ==
=== Those required to take the oath ===
The following persons must take the Oath of Allegiance before occupying a governmental, military, police, or judicial post. Generally, these individuals are appointed by the monarch or relevant viceroy, meaning they serve at His Majesty's pleasure and are charged with creating or administering the law.

==== Federal ====
- Governors general of Canada
- Members of the King's Privy Council for Canada
- Senators
- Members of Parliament
- Clerk of the House of Commons
- Citizenship judges
- All employees of the Canadian Security Intelligence Service
- Recruits, officers, or naval cadets of the Canadian Armed Forces
- Members of the Royal Canadian Mounted Police

==== Provincial ====
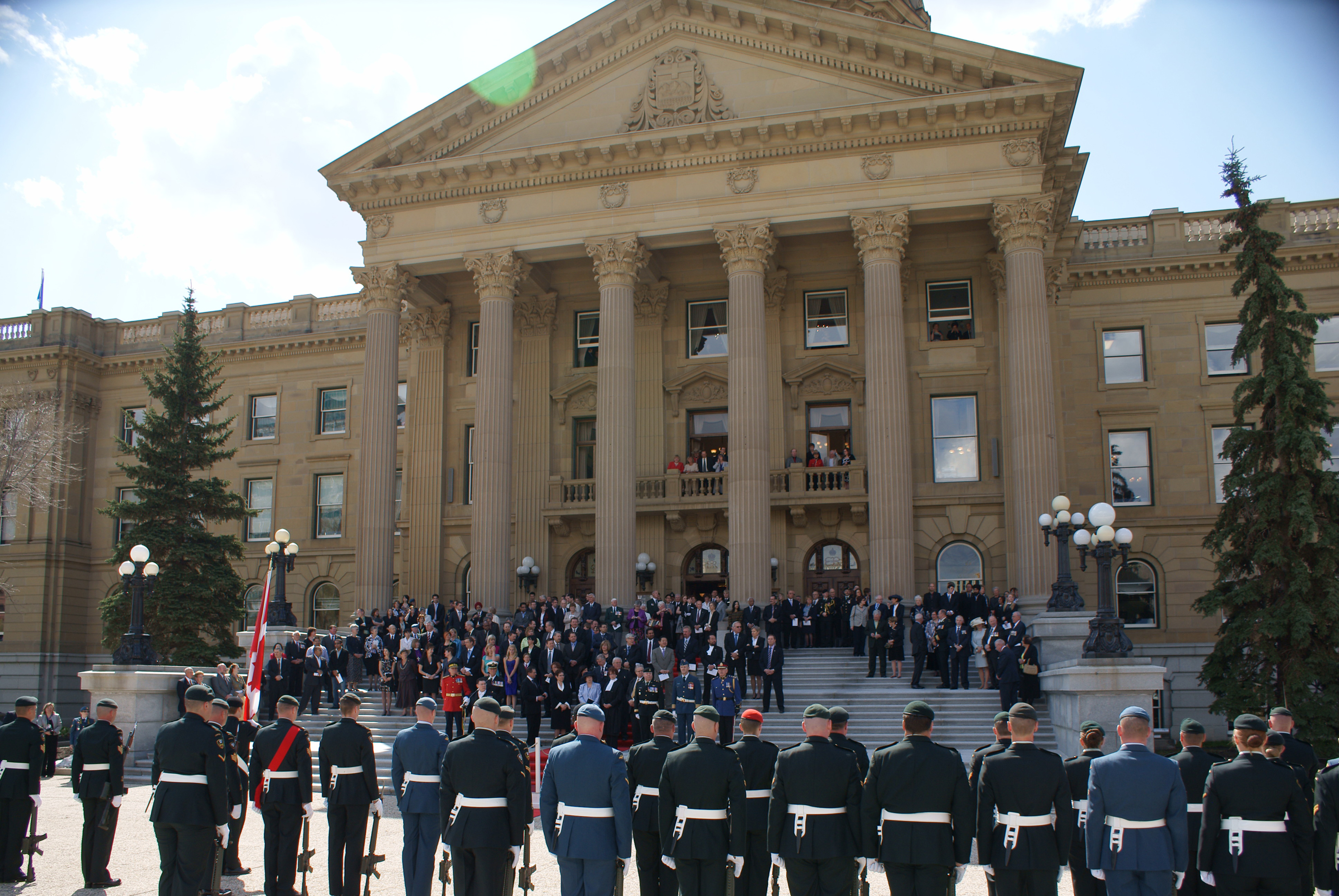
The swearing-in of Lieutenant Governor of Alberta Donald Ethell, in front of the Legislature Building in Edmonton, 11 May 201

- Lieutenant governors
- Members of a legislature, excluding Quebec (MLAs, MPPs, and MHAs)
- Justices of the appellate courts in British Columbia, New Brunswick, Newfoundland and Labrador, and Saskatchewan
- Justices of the superior courts,
- Justices of provincial courts in Alberta, British Columbia, Newfoundland and Labrador, Prince Edward Island, and Saskatchewan
- Justices of the peace in British Columbia
- Auditor general of Ontario
- Staff of the civil service in Ontario
- All other Crown appointees in Ontario
- All police officers, railway constables, special constables, and reserve and auxiliary constables in British Columbia
- All police officers, bylaw enforcement officers, and special constables in Nova Scotia
- All police officers in Saskatchewan, New Brunswick, and Alberta
- Mayors and councillors in Nova Scotia and all counsillors in Ontario (only to the reigning monarch)
- Medical examiners and investigators in Manitoba
- Sheriffs in Newfoundland and Labrador
- Lawyers in Alberta and Newfoundland and Labrador
- Notaries public in Newfoundland and Labrador

==== Territorial ====
- Commissioners and deputy commissioners of Yukon, Northwest Territories, and Nunavut
- Justices of the territorial courts in the Northwest Territories and Yukon
- Members of the Executive Council of Nunavut
- Members of the Legislative Assemblies of Nunavut and Yukon
- Lawyers in Northwest Territories and Nunavut

==== Other ====
- Priests and deacons at ordination and Rectors at inductions or installations in certain dioceses of the Anglican Church of Canada.

=== Those for whom the oath is optional ===
The Oath of Allegiance is optional for these individuals:

==== Provincial ====
- Lawyers in New Brunswick, Nova Scotia, and Ontario
- Board members of a regional district in British Columbia
- School trustees in British Columbia

==== Territorial ====
- Lawyers in Yukon
- Mayors and municipal councillors of Yukon

=== Those desiring to take the oath ===
Anyone who desires to swear or affirm allegiance to the King may, while in Canada, do so before a justice of the peace or anyone else authorized ex officio or by commission from the Crown, under the terms of the Oaths of Allegiance Act.

== Administration of the oath ==
Michaëlle Jean reciting the Oath of Allegiance as she is sworn in as the 27th Governor General of Canada, 27 September 2005

=== Crown appointees ===
The Letters Patent issued in 1947 by King George VI outline that the Oath of Allegiance must be taken by a newly appointed governor general and stipulate that the oath must be administered by the chief justice or other judge of the Supreme Court of Canada in the presence of members of the King's Privy Council. In the 19th century, the oath was recited by recently commissioned federal viceroys at whatever port they arrived at in Canada. However, the contemporary practice is to swear-in governors general as part of a ceremony in the Senate chamber on Parliament Hill.

New members of the King's Privy Council recite, along with the Oath of Office, a specific oath that contains a variant on the Oath of Allegiance, as administered by the Clerk of the Privy Council, usually in the presence of the governor general at Government House (Rideau Hall) in Ottawa. Twice, however, the oath has been delivered in front of the reigning monarch: In 1967, the year of Canada's centennial, the provincial premiers then in office were sworn in as members of the Privy Council before Elizabeth II in a ceremony on Parliament Hill and, during her tour of Canada to mark the 125th anniversary of Confederation, new appointees to the Privy Council recited the oath before the Queen at her Ottawa residence. The chief justice of the Supreme Court similarly recites the Oath of Allegiance in front of the governor general.

=== Parliamentarians ===
The clerk of the House, or an authorized designate, administers the Oath of Allegiance to both new and returning members of Parliament. Failure to take the oath constitutes an absolute bar on sitting or voting in Parliament, along with a denial of the associated salary; this does not mean the person ceases to be a member of the House; simply that they cannot sit or participate in it. In 1875, George Turner Orton, member for Wellington Centre, inadvertently failed to swear the oath. Though Orton did eventually take his Oath of Allegiance, the matter was referred to the Select Standing Committee on Privileges and Elections, which found that the votes Orton cast in the House prior to his swearing the oath were rendered invalid. The only way to change this stipulation would be to amend the constitution; though, it is not entirely clear whether or not this could be done under the general amending formula (through resolutions of the federal Parliament and of the parliaments of at least two-thirds of the provinces having at least 50% of the population), or if it would necessitate the undivided agreement of all the parliamentary houses across Canada, as is required for any constitutional alteration that affects the Crown.

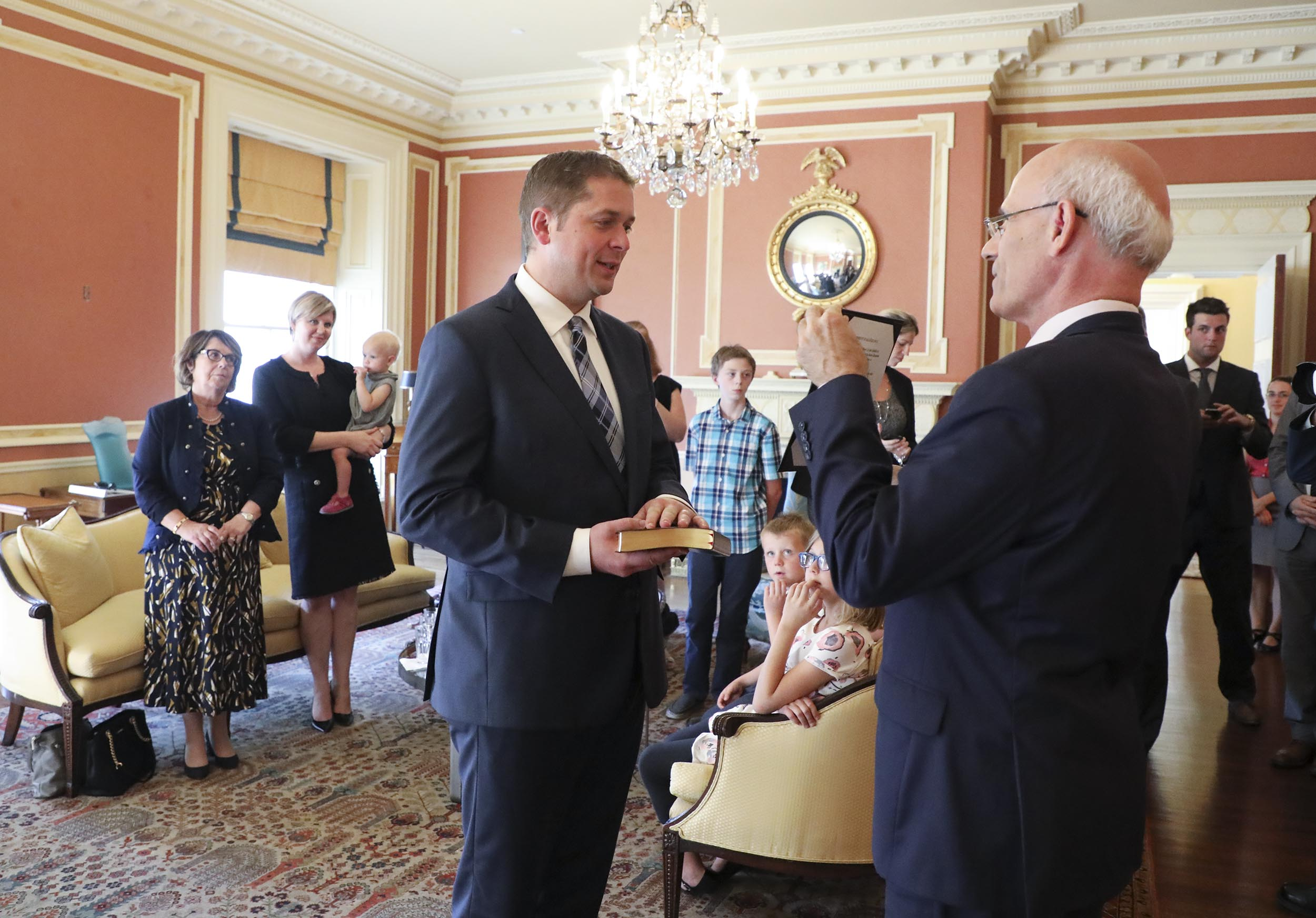
Then-leader of the Conservative Party of Canada, Andrew Scheer, is sworn into the Queen's Privy Council by Clerk of the Privy Council Michael Wernick, in front of Governor General David Johnston, at Rideau Hall, 25 September 2017

A breach of the oath can also be seen as an act punishable by the denial of the offender's ability to sit in the House of Commons. Actions such as making treasonous comments in a time of war could be considered a break of the oath, as the oath to the monarch is considered an oath to the country. But, expressing anti-Confederation sentiments is not, so long as the proponent continues to work for their cause within the laws and customs of Canada. Also, the King could remain head of any new state formed after secession from Canada.

As early as 1867, this notion was tested: Joseph Howe was an opponent to Confederation; but, was elected to the House of Commons and took the Oath of Allegiance, after which he continued to work towards dissolving the union. Later, in 1976, members of the sovereigntist Parti Québécois (PQ) were elected to the National Assembly of Quebec; according to press reports, some of those persons swore the oath with their fingers crossed and others later added flippant commentary to their oath, such as, "et aussi au roi de France" ("and also to the king of France"), and, "Vive la république" ("Long live the republic!"), or whispered the words, "Sa Majesté la Reine Élisabeth II". In 2003, Premier of Quebec Bernard Landry, leader of the PQ, added to the oath, "for the duration of the present constitutional order, which will hopefully change one day in a democratic fashion." None of the actions had any effect on the enforcement of the oath itself, however.

=== Canadian Armed Forces members ===
Allegiance and loyalty to the monarch, and the manner in which they are expressed, are specifically outlined in the Canadian Armed Forces regulations and subordinate orders. Within the King's Regulations and Orders for the Canadian Forces, it is stipulated that all Canadian citizens or British subjects who enroll in the forces must take the Oath of Allegiance before either a commissioned officer or a justice of the peace.

I, [name], do swear [or, for a solemn affirmation, solemnly affirm] that I will be faithful and bear true allegiance to His Majesty King Charles the Third, King of Canada, his heirs and successors according to law. So help me God.

Those who are not Canadian citizens or British subjects must recite a longer oath:

I, [name], do solemnly swear [or affirm] that I will well and truly serve His Majesty, King Charles the Third, King of Canada, his heirs and successors according to law, in the Canadian Forces until lawfully released, that I will resist His Majesty's enemies and cause His Majesty's peace to be kept and maintained and that I will, in all matters pertaining to my service, faithfully discharge my duty. So help me God.

The words so help me God are omitted if a solemn affirmation is taken.

== Opposition and augmentation ==
=== Federal ===
Amendments to the Oath of Allegiance have been proposed in the federal scope. The difficulty in altering the constitution led members of Parliament (MPs) in Ottawa to table various bills aiming to alter the Parliament of Canada Act, instead. While none were ever successful, certain MPs have recited further pledges in the presence of their constituents or added their own pledge after reciting the Oath of Allegiance. In 2005, Senator Raymond Lavigne uttered the words, "and to my country, Canada," at the end of the Oath of Allegiance, which raised questions from other senators and Lavigne was instructed to take the oath again, without the amendment. Following this, the Senator proposed that the Senate rules be changed to add an oath to Canada after the oath to the sovereign, in the form of, "I, [name], do swear (or solemnly affirm) that I will be faithful and bear true allegiance to Canada." The motion never passed. René Arseneault tabled a private member's bill in January 2024 seeking to replace the oath to the Canadian monarch with simply a promise to carry the duties of an MP "in the best interest of Canada while upholding its constitution," without defining what Canada means. Pierre Vincent, speaking for Citizens for a Canadian Republic called the oath "colonial, medieval stuff" comparable to a former Mexican tradition of "sacrificing virgins", while John Fraser, President of the Institute for the Study of the Crown in Canada, called the bill "a stupid idea" and "all based on emotionalism", saying "I don't think we should marginalize something [the Crown] that is an integral part of our system of government." Barbara Messamore, a professor of history at the University of the Fraser Valley and an expert on the Canadian Crown, defined the move as a "profound change by stealth" and allegiance to Canada's constitution and system of government as "pretty significant." The bill was defeated in April 2024.

All members of the federal Civil Service were previously required to take the Oath of Allegiance before being officially hired; a stipulation that prompted Vincent, who is of Acadian descent and, at the time, a civil servant who refused to swear the oath, to undertake a three-year legal challenge against the Public Service Commission. The latter found that Vincent could keep his job with the Civil Service and, while the Supreme Court did rule that civil servants continued to be employees of the monarch, royal assent was granted to the Public Service Modernization Act in 2003, which removed the necessity of the bureaucratic civil servants to take the oath to their employer.

The inclusion of the Oath of Allegiance in the Oath of Citizenship has also met with opposition; though, this was never a constitutional matter, instead falling within the scope of the Citizenship Act.

=== Alberta ===
Thirty two law professors in Alberta sent a letter to Minister of Justice Tyler Shandro, in July 2022, asking that the Executive Council table legislation in the legislature that proposes to remove the requirement that prospective lawyers recite the Oath of Allegiance before being admitted to the provincial the bar. This followed Prabjot Singh Wirring, an articling student in Edmonton, suing the province on the basis that swearing the oath would contradict his religious beliefs. A similar claim against the Oath of Citizenship was made in the Ontario Superior Court of Justice in 2007. In that case, the provision to take the oath was upheld. Alberta Crown attorneys have, in response to Wirring, argued the oath to the King is a commitment to the constitution of Canada, including its democratic principles, and is secular; Wirring has, they claimed, a "misunderstanding of the oath."

Three Indigenous Canadian graduates of law schools in different provinces took legal action, on 7 September 2022, against the Alberta Crown and Law Society of Alberta seeking exemption from having to swear the Oath of Allegiance before being let into the Alberta bar. One of the women, Anita Cardinal, a member of the Woodland Cree First Nation, claimed the Canadian Crown does not have sovereignty over Indigenous peoples, contrary to multiple rulings by the Supreme Court of Canada. Another in the party, Rachel Snow, of the Wesley First Nation, stated she would not recognize the authority of "the system [the legal order of the state as embodied in the monarch] that has caused generational and ongoing harms to her people"; though Snow believes the oath is to the British Crown.

=== New Brunswick ===
A loophole in provincial law was discovered by René Arseneault after he, in 1992, opposed taking the oath before being admitted to the bar. He argued successfully in court that the law did not permit the Court of Appeal to refuse his application to the Law Society until he recited the oath. Arseneault became the first member of the bar admitted without taking the oath.

=== Ontario ===
Ontario Member of Provincial Parliament Dominic Agostino proposed in 1996 that the Legislative Assembly of Ontario follow that of Quebec and add another requisite oath of allegiance to "Canada", to be taken by MPPs following the oath to the sovereign. However, the Standing Committee on the Legislative Assembly found that the monarch referred to in the Oath of Allegiance was already the personification of the Canadian state and it was thus redundant to offer allegiance to both the Queen and to Canada.

A councillor in Prescott, Ontario, Lee McConnell, proposed in February 2023 that city council send a motion to the provincial Cabinet requesting that a bill be tabled in parliament to amend the Municipal Act so as to either remove or make optional the Oath of Allegiance required of all newly elected councillors. McConnell's motion suggested, instead, that municipal representatives swear an oath to "the country, province, and community". None of Prescott's other councillors seconded the motion, leading to its immediate failure.

=== Quebec ===
Early opposition to the Oath of Allegiance was expressed by the inhabitants of the Province of Quebec shortly following the transfer of that territory from Louis XV to King George III via the 1763 Treaty of Paris. The Quebec Act, issued in 1774, subsequently established a special Oath of Allegiance for the Roman Catholics of Quebec that, unlike the one sworn by others, which had remained the same since the reign of Queen Elizabeth I, bore no references to the Protestant faith. It read:

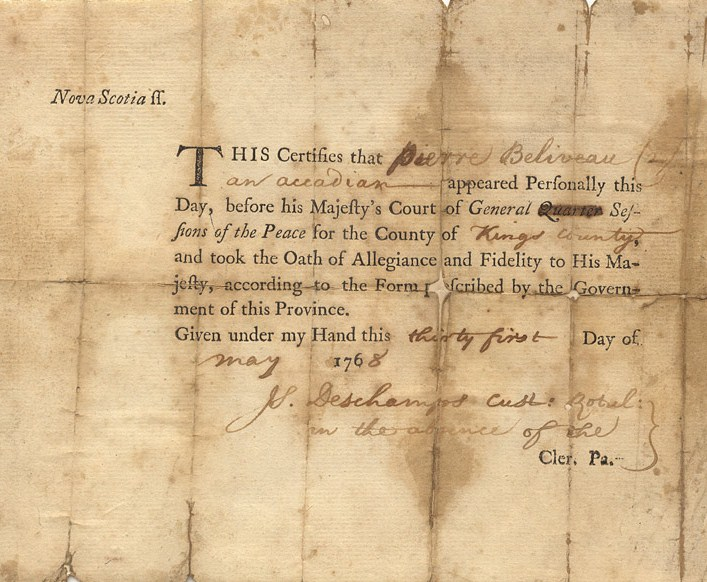
The Oath of allegiance signed by Pierre Beliveau, an Acadian, on 31 May 1768

I [name] do sincerely promise and swear that I will be faithful and bear true allegiance to His Majesty King George and him will defend to the utmost of my power, against all traitorous conspiracies and attempts whatsoever, which shall be made against his person. Crown, and dignity; and I will do my utmost endeavor to disclose and make known to His Majesty, his heirs and successors, all treasons and traitorous conspiracies and attempts, which I shall know to be against him, or any of them; and all this I do swear without any equivocation, mental evasion, or secret reservation, and renouncing all pardons and dispensations from any power or person whomsoever to the contrary. So help me God.

In 1970, the recently elected members of the sovereigntist Parti Québécois (PQ) refused to recite the Oath of Allegiance before taking their seats in the National Assembly of Quebec. At the time, all the other parties in the assembly agreed that the oath was outdated and needed to be amended. The Act Respecting the National Assembly of Quebec was granted royal assent in 1982, in which a supplementary oath pledging loyalty to "the people of Quebec" was included, though, it does not define what "the people of Quebec" means. The Members' Manual of the National Assembly outlines that this additional oath is to "the people" and constitution of Quebec, distinct from the Oath of Allegiance, which is an oath to the country via the then-Queen. Still, some saw the monarch, in that context, as the representative of Quebec and not of Canada, taking into account Canada's "divisible" Crown.

The PQ and its leader, Paul St-Pierre Plamondon, said after the general election in 2022 that they would not take the Oath of Allegiance upon attempting to take their seats in the National Assembly of Quebec, arguing, "you can't serve two masters at the same time." On 19 October 2022, the 11 Québec Solidaire MNAs announced they also did not wish to swear the Oath of Allegiance. In response, the President of the National Assembly, François Paradis, asserted that the PQ and Québec Solidaire MNAs were required to recite the oath or risk expulsion from the legislature. While QS members eventually did swear allegiance, on 1 December 2022, PQ MNAs continued to refuse and were stopped from entering the legislature. The Executive Council, occupied by the Coalition Avenir Québec party, headed by François Legault, thereafter tabled a bill that purported to amend the constitution of Canada so as to add to Section 128 of the Constitution Act, 1867—the clause requiring the Oath of Allegiance for legislators—a statement that the section does not apply to Quebec. That bill passed the assembly with unanimous consent on 6 December 2022. The law is enabled by section 45 of the Constitution Act, 1982.

After the 2026 election all 59 elected Parti Québécois MNAs did not take the Oath to the King. It was reported to be the first time a governing party did not swear an oath to the monarchy. The Quebec Liberals, Québec solidaire, and Conservatives would do the same would follow suit and not swear an oath to the king.

=== Prince Edward Island ===
Since 2022, Samuel LeBlanc, a lawyer of Acadian descent practising mainly in New Brunswick, has refused to swear the Oath of Allegiance required to become a member of the bar in Prince Edward Island, drawing a connection between the modern oath to the Canadian monarch and the involvement of an oath to the monarch of Great Britain in the Expulsion of the Acadians between 1755 and 1764. In June 2023, the Ministry of Justice evaluated amendment to the Law on Legal Professions; as of November 2023, the Legal Profession Act removed any reference to the monarch in the oath for admission to the Prince Edward Island Law Society.

== See also ==
- Oath of allegiance
- Oath of office
- Oath of citizenship
