= Oath of Citizenship (Canada) =

Oath by prospective Canadian citizens

The Oath of Citizenship, or Citizenship Oath (in French: serment de citoyenneté), is a statement recited and signed by those who apply to become citizens of Canada. Administered at a ceremony presided over by a designated official, the oath is a promise or declaration of fealty to the Canadian monarch and a promise to abide by Canada's laws and uphold the duties of a Canadian citizen; upon signing the oath, citizenship is granted to the applicant.

The vow's roots lie in the oath of allegiance taken in the United Kingdom, the modern form of which was implemented in 1689 by King William II and III and Queen Mary II and was inherited by and used in Canada prior to 1947. With the enactment of the Citizenship Act that year, the Canadian Oath of Citizenship was established. Proposals for modification of the oath have surfaced from time to time, including removing references to the sovereign, adding loyalty to societal principles, and/or adding specific mention to Canada. However, it is maintained within Canada's legal system that an oath to the sovereign is "in fact an oath to a domestic institution that represents egalitarian governance and the rule of law". Consequently, it has only been modified twice, once in 1977 and again in 2021.

== Composition ==
Prior to 1947, Canadian law continued to refer to Canadian nationals as British subjects, despite the country becoming independent from the United Kingdom in 1931. As the country shared the same person as its sovereign with the other countries of the Commonwealth, people immigrating from those states were not required to recite any oath upon immigration to Canada; those coming from a non-Commonwealth country would take the Oath of Allegiance. When India became a republic in 1950, however, the Commonwealth contained countries that did not recognize the monarch shared amongst the Commonwealth realms as their own, though still regarding that individual as Head of the Commonwealth.

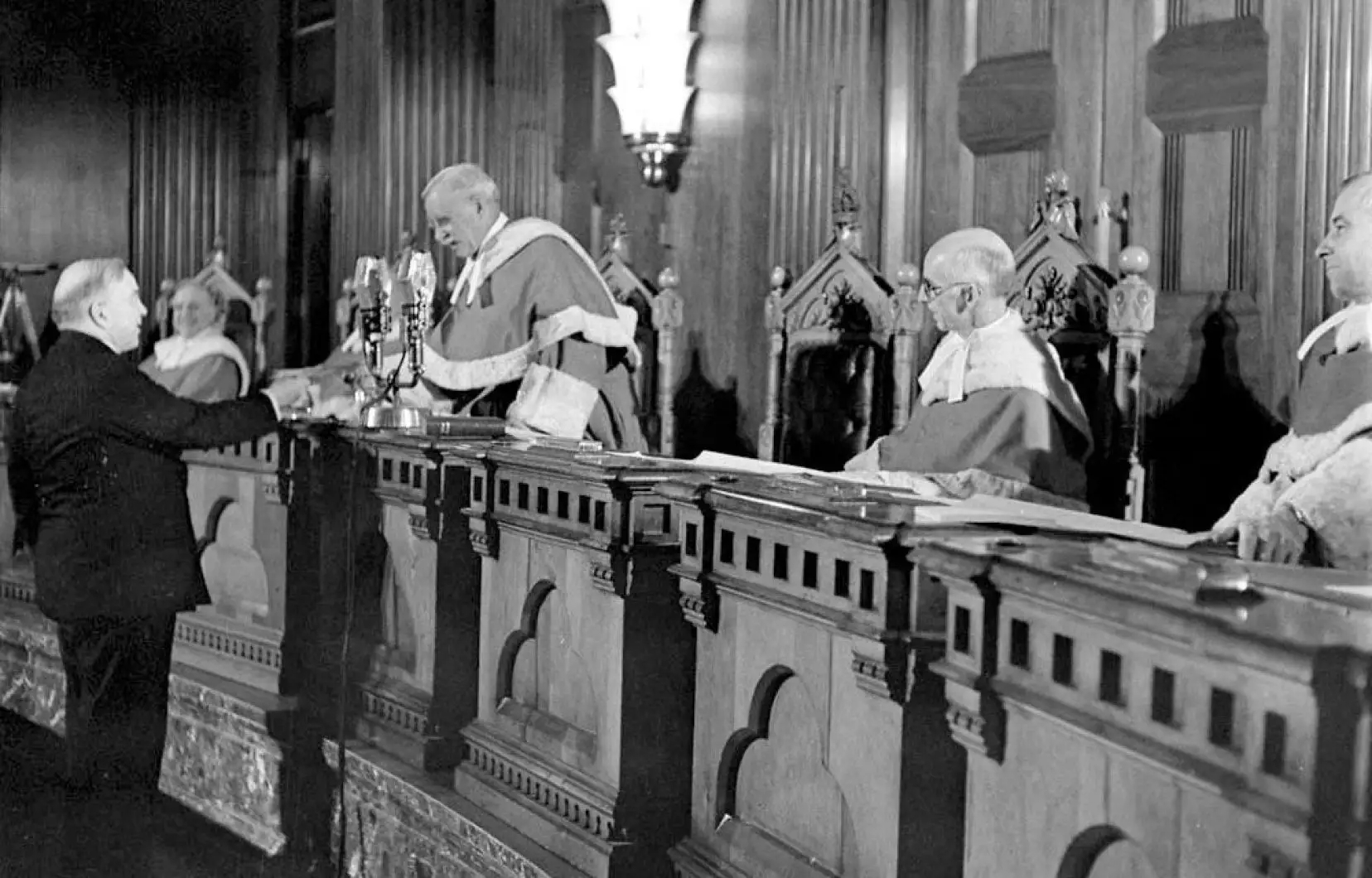
Prime Minister William Lyon Mackenzie King becomes the first person to take the Oath of Citizenship, from Chief Justice Thibaudeau Rinfret, in the Supreme Court, 3 January 1947

With potential new Commonwealth immigrants who did not already owe allegiance to Canada's shared sovereign, the Parliament of Canada thus enacted the Canadian Citizenship Act 1946, which came into effect on 1 January of the following year. New immigrants were then required to recite the Oath of Allegiance for Purposes of Citizenship, which was an adaptation of the original Oath of Allegiance: "I swear that I will be faithful and bear true allegiance to His Majesty King George the Sixth, His Heirs and Successors, according to law, and that I will faithfully observe the laws of Canada and fulfil my duties as a Canadian citizen"; Prime Minister William Lyon Mackenzie King was the first person to take this oath. Though new citizens were thereafter required by law to recite the Oath of Citizenship, on 1 April 1949, 359,000 Newfoundlanders became Canadian citizens without taking the oath, when the British Dominion joined Canadian Confederation.

By the mid-1970s, it was thought that because Canada had a shared monarch the Oath of Citizenship should clarify for new citizens that the fealty they were offering was specifically to the monarch in her capacity as the Canadian head of state, rather than, for example, the head of state of Jamaica or of the United Kingdom. Thus, as part of an amendment to the Citizenship Act in 1977, the words Queen of Canada were inserted after the Queen's name and the oath was officially named the Canadian Citizenship Oath. This new format maintained the traditional assertion of allegiance to the monarch, but also inserted the name of the country three times in a way consistent with Canada's status as a constitutional monarchy—i.e., in a monarchy the state is personified, not treated as an abstraction or a corporation.

Until 2021, the Oath of Citizenship had been the following text:

I swear (or affirm) that I will be faithful and bear true allegiance to Her Majesty Queen Elizabeth the Second, Queen of Canada, Her Heirs and Successors, and that I will faithfully observe the laws of Canada and fulfil my duties as a Canadian citizen.

— Schedule, Citizenship Act (R.S.C., 1985, c. C-29) (as at 2021-01-01)

The Truth and Reconcilliation Commission recommended it be changed to the following:

I swear (or affirm) that I will be faithful and bear true allegiance to Her Majesty Queen Elizabeth II, Queen of Canada, Her Heirs and Successors, and that I will faithfully observe the laws of Canada including Treaties with Indigenous Peoples, and fulfill my duties as a Canadian citizen.

The equivalent in French was the following:

Je jure (ou affirme solennellement) que je serai fidèle et porterai sincère allégeance à Sa Majesté la Reine Elizabeth Deux, Reine du Canada, à ses héritiers et successeurs, que j’observerai fidèlement les lois du Canada, y compris les traités conclus avec les peuples autochtones, et que je remplirai loyalement mes obligations de citoyen canadien.

Oath of Citizenship

Parliament of Canada
- Long title: An Act to amend the Citizenship Act (Truth and Reconciliation Commission of Canada’s call to action number 94)
- Citation: S.C. 2021, c. 13
- Considered by: House of Commons of Canada
- Considered by: Senate of Canada
- Assented to: 2021-06-21
- Commenced: 2021-06-22

Legislative history

Initiating chamber: House of Commons of Canada
- Bill citation: Bill C-8
- Introduced by: Marco Mendicino MP, Minister of Immigration, Refugees and Citizenship
- First reading: 2020-10-22
- Second reading: 2020-12-10
- Third reading: 2021-06-03

Revising chamber: Senate of Canada
- Member(s) in charge: Margaret Dawn Anderson
- First reading: 2021-06-03
- Second reading: 2021-06-08
- Third reading: 2021-06-10
- Status: In force

Responding to Call to Action 94, the Government passed Bill C-8, which received Royal Assent on June 21, 2021 and updated the Oath to recognize Indigenous Peoples.

The Oath of Citizenship is today a legally binding oral and written contract intended to ensure that new Canadian citizens promise to obey the laws and customs of their new country, fulfil their duties as citizens, and recognize the authority of the monarch as the personification of the state and various entities and concepts. The oath further indicates that any oath given to the king is equally given to William, Prince of Wales, Prince George of Wales, and all heirs and successors to the Canadian throne. Its current form is as follows:

I swear (or affirm) that I will be faithful and bear true allegiance to His Majesty King Charles the Third, King of Canada, His Heirs and Successors, and that I will faithfully observe the laws of Canada, including the Constitution, which recognizes and affirms the Aboriginal and treaty rights of First Nations, Inuit and Métis peoples, and fulfil my duties as a Canadian citizen.

— Schedule, An Act to amend the Citizenship Act (Truth and Reconciliation Commission of Canada’s call to action number 94) (S.C. 2021, c. 13)

The equally valid French language version of the oath of citizenship is as follows:

Je jure fidélité et sincère allégeance à Sa Majesté Le roi Charles Trois, Roi du Canada, à ses héritiers et successeurs et je jure d’observer fidèlement les lois du Canada, y compris la Constitution, qui reconnaît et confirme les droits — ancestraux ou issus de traités — des Premières Nations, des Inuits et des Métis, et de remplir loyalement mes obligations de citoyen canadien.

— Annexe, Loi modifiant la Loi sur la citoyenneté (appel à l’action numéro 94 de la Commission de vérité et réconciliation du Canada) (L.C. 2021, ch. 13)

Or, the French affirmation:

J’affirme solennellement que je serai fidèle et porterai sincère allégeance à Sa Majesté Le roi Charles Trois, Roi du Canada, à ses héritiers et successeurs, que j’observerai fidèlement les lois du Canada, y compris la Constitution, qui reconnaît et confirme les droits — ancestraux ou issus de traités — des Premières Nations, des Inuits et des Métis, et que je remplirai loyalement mes obligations de citoyen canadien.

— Annexe, Loi modifiant la Loi sur la citoyenneté (appel à l’action numéro 94 de la Commission de vérité et réconciliation du Canada) (L.C. 2021, ch. 13)

== Administration of the oath ==
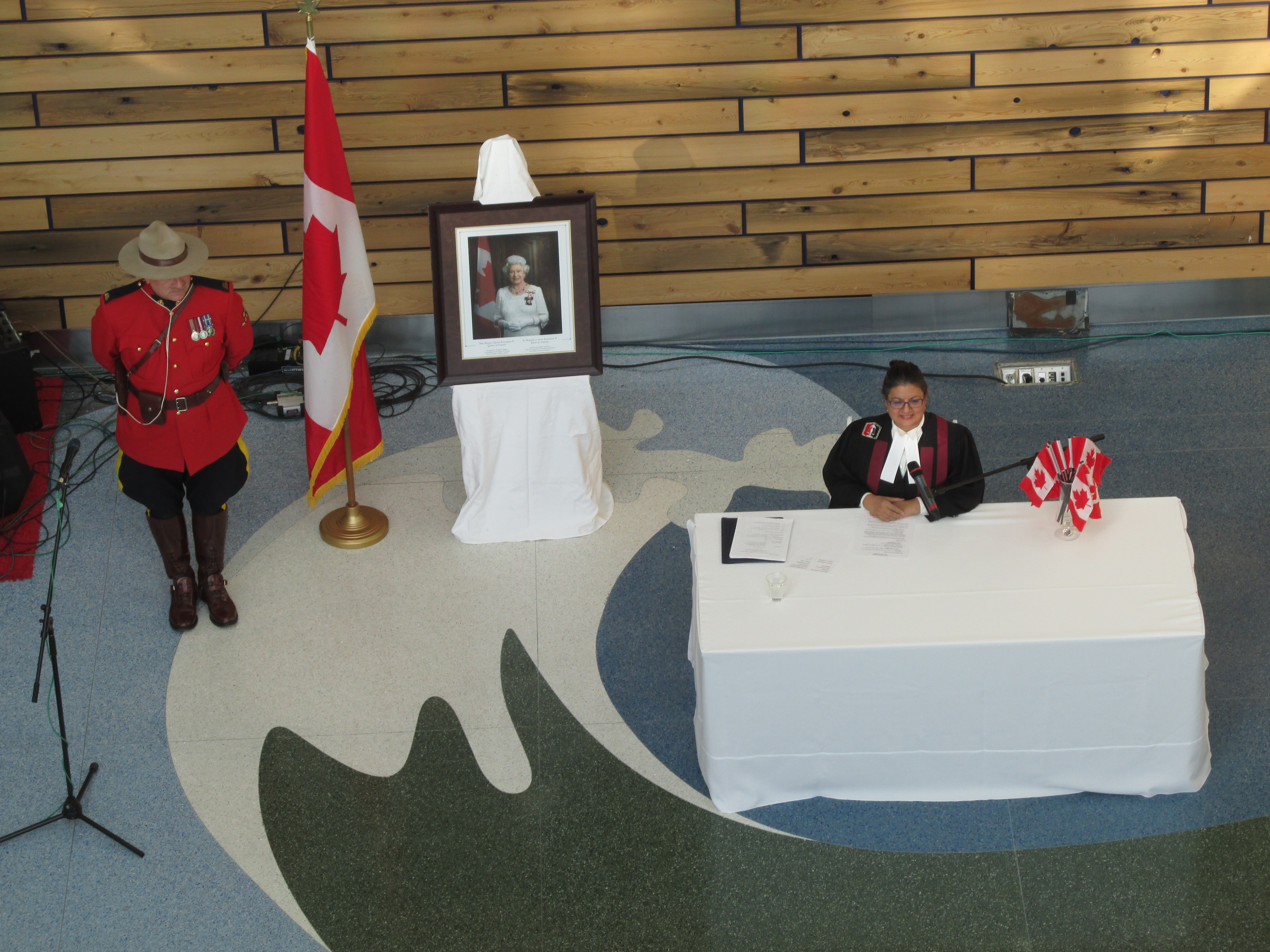
A citizenship judge presides over a citizenship ceremony in Toronto, with a portrait of Queen Elizabeth II, the Canadian flag, and a Royal Canadian Mounted Police officer positioned behind them

The Oath of Citizenship must be recited by all citizenship applicants in Canada in order to obtain citizenship, save for those under the age of 14 and, at the discretion of the Minister of Citizenship and Immigration, those who are prevented from understanding the significance of taking the oath due to mental disabilities. However, all must sign the oath, with parents signing on behalf of any of their children who are minors. These actions are carried out in the context of a citizenship ceremony, approximately 2,500 of which take place each year, and are functions normally presided over by a citizenship judge. Further, the governor general, a lieutenant governor, territorial commissioner, a member of the Order of Canada, a member of either the Order of Military Merit Order of Merit of the Police Forces or the Royal Victorian Order (Lieutenant and Commander), Sovereign's Medal for Volunteers (aged 18+) the Polar Medal or Meritorious Service Decorations authorized by the Registrar of Canadian Citizenship, or holders of the Victoria Cross may preside at a ceremony if a citizenship judge is unavailable. These events also include the participation of a clerk of the court and, when available, a Royal Canadian Mounted Police (RCMP) officer. The Canadian flag must be displayed, along with other national symbols, including a portrait of the reigning monarch.

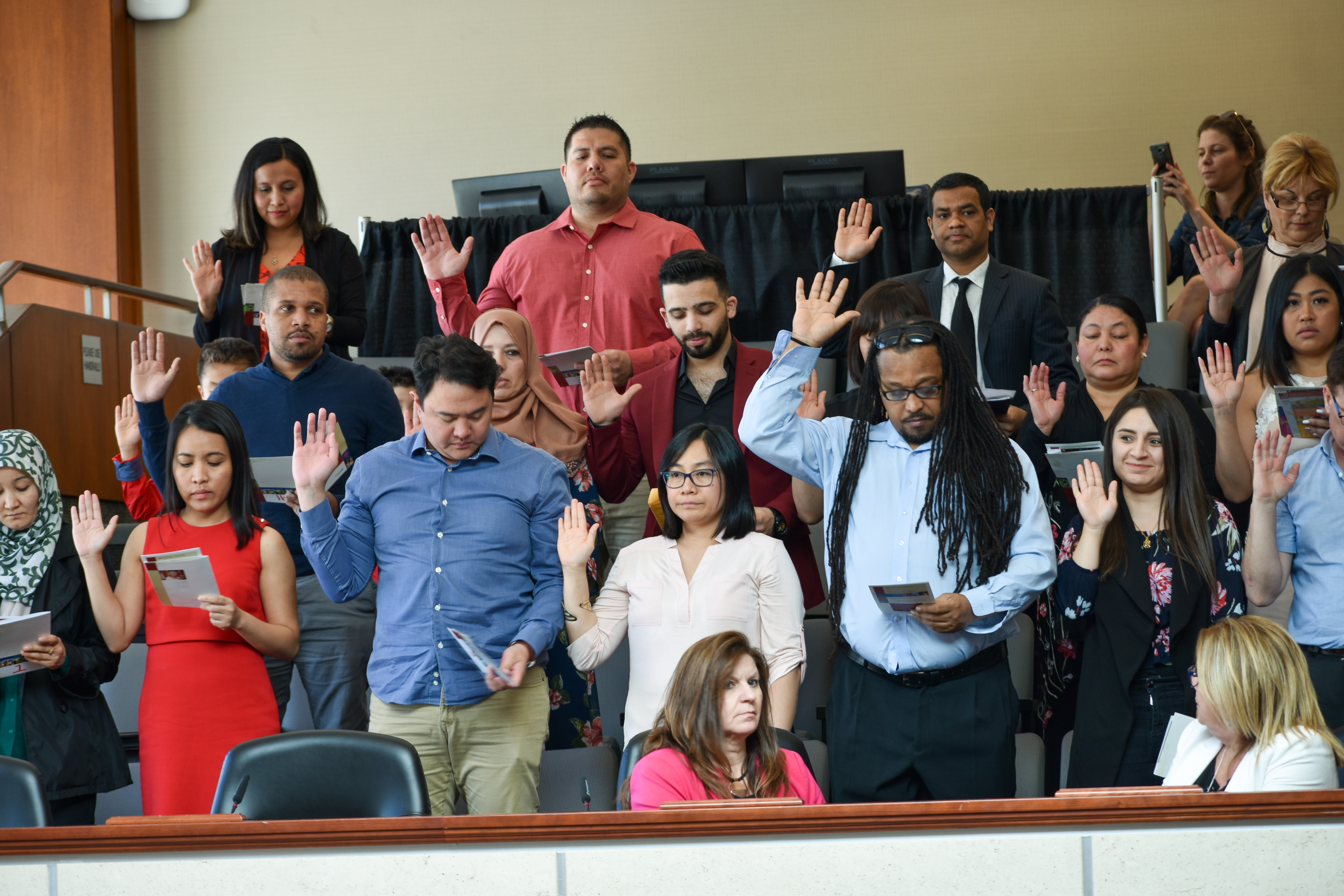
Participants of the citizenship ceremony raise their right hand for the Oath of Citizenship

The RCMP officer opens the ceremony in the name of the King, followed by the clerk introducing the applicants for citizenship, stating: "Your Honour (or other appropriate rank), these people assembled here have qualified for Canadian citizenship and appear before you to take the Oath of Citizenship" or "Judge, Mr. Mrs. Ms. [name of citizenship judge or presiding official], in accordance with the provisions of the Citizenship Act, it is my privilege to present to you [number of] applicants for citizenship who have complied with the requirements of the Citizenship Act and are now ready to take the oath of citizenship and become Canadian citizens." The presiding official addresses the crowd with a short speech outlining the duties and responsibilities of being a Canadian citizen, after which the participants are instructed to stand, raise their right hand and the judge or presiding officer leads the applicants in the recitation the Oath of Citizenship in both French and English. Those who have taken the oath then sign the oath document and the presiding officer presents each of them with their Certificate of Citizenship. After some closing remarks, the ceremony is concluded with the singing of the national anthem in English or French or a bilingual version that is provided.

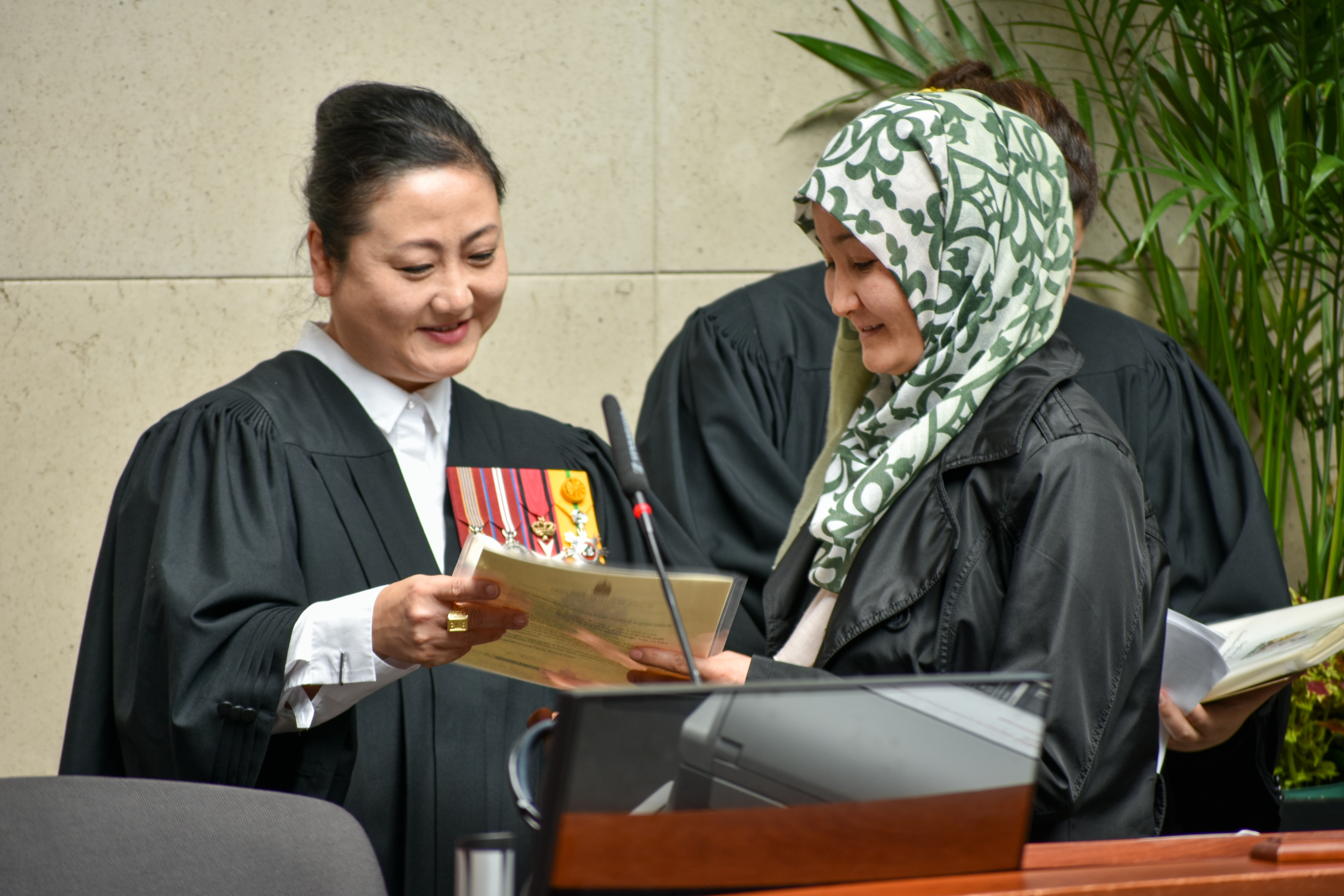
A citizenship judge presents a Certificate of Citizenship to a new Canadian citizen during a citizenship ceremony in Hamilton, Ontario

It has been stated by Sheikh Ahmad Kutty, of the Islamic Institute of Toronto, that Muslims may take the Oath of Citizenship "as long as you are clear in your mind that you are doing so without contravening the sovereignty of Allah" and that reciting it should not be viewed as a form of shirk.

== Proposed changes ==
Since the amendment to the vow in 1977, the idea of modifying it yet again has come up periodically. In 1987, the government proposed alterations to the Citizenship Act that included studying to what or whom allegiance should be given in the Oath of Citizenship: to the Crown, the country, or both, and in what order? No changes were made.

The subject was addressed again in 1994, when the House of Commons Standing Committee on Citizenship and Immigration examined changes to the Citizenship Act. Several witnesses presented divergent views on the oath: some argued that the present form should be retained, while others expressed a desire to see the name of the country given prominence, though not necessarily with the absence of mention of the sovereign. The committee recommended a new citizenship oath: I pledge full allegiance to Canada and Her Majesty Queen Elizabeth the Second, Queen of Canada, and swear to faithfully obey the laws and fulfill my duties as a citizen. Sergio Marchi, then minister of Citizenship and Immigration, proposed a further step of creating a new "declaration" of citizenship, and commissioned ten Canadian writers to compose a pledge, with the explicit instruction not to refer to the monarch of Canada; the suggested declaration decided on was: I am a citizen of Canada, and I make this commitment: to uphold our laws and freedoms; to respect our people in their diversity; to work for our common well-being; and to safeguard and honour this ancient northern land. Marchi was told by then Prime Minister Jean Chrétien to abandon the project.

By 1996, the Minister of Citizenship and Immigration, then Lucienne Robillard, stated on the suggested alterations to the oath: "This is a difficult decision to make, because I realise that when you speak about changing the oath, people think you want to change all the monarchy system. We don't want a discussion like that in Canada right now." According to an Angus Reid Strategies survey for Citizenship and Immigration Canada, conducted in January 1996, 51% of respondents felt that a new oath of allegiance should remove any reference to the Queen, and 38% felt that allegiance should be pledged to both Canada and its sovereign. Only 5% favoured swearing allegiance only to the monarch; though, at the same time, only 5% of Canadians were aware the Queen was their head of state. Meanwhile, press reaction to the continued proposals for alternate oaths was muted. The Globe and Mail editorial of 12 December 1998 stated: "The language is being drained dry, killed by a thousand smiley-faced cuts," while the Ottawa Citizen was more critical on 11 December: "The new citizenship oath... leaves us cold... It would strengthen the political argument for abolishing the monarchy on the death of Queen Elizabeth; and it would test monarchist support by seeing how many Canadians even notice or holler. We noticed. Consider this a holler."

Bill C-63, the proposed Citizenship of Canada Act, was put before parliament in 1999; in it was a variant on the present Oath of Citizenship:

From this day forward, I pledge my loyalty and allegiance to Canada and Her Majesty Elizabeth the Second, Queen of Canada. I promise to respect our country's rights and freedoms, to defend our democratic values, to faithfully observe our laws and fulfil my duties and obligations as a Canadian citizen.

In French, this would be:

Dorénavant, je promets fidélité et allégeance au Canada et à Sa Majesté Elizabeth Deux, Reine du Canada. Je m'engage à respecter les droits et libertés de notre pays, à défendre nos valeurs démocratiques, à observer fidèlement nos lois et à remplir mes devoirs et obligations de citoyen(ne) canadien(ne).

Member of Parliament John H. Bryden put forward an amendment that would remove the sovereign from the oath altogether: In pledging allegiance to Canada, I take my place among Canadians, a people united by God whose sacred trust is to uphold these five principles: equality of opportunity, freedom of speech, democracy, basic human rights, and the rule of law. Bryden's proposal was defeated in a vote of 189 to 31, and Bill C-63 itself never received Royal Assent; after approval by the House of Commons and a second reading in the Senate, the bill was under consideration by the Senate Standing Committee on Legal and Constitutional Affairs when a federal election was called, resulting in the bill's demise on the Order Paper. Subsequent Bills C-16 (2000) and C-18 (2002) also proposed the same changes to the Oath of Citizenship; the former also died on the Order Paper due to the prorogation of parliament, while the latter never made it past second reading in the House of Commons.

Throughout the process, the Monarchist League of Canada, while not against amendment in general, voiced its strongest opposition to the proposals to remove the sovereign. From the group there was also commentary against what it saw as being Americanised and vague terminology, as well as what could be construed as the separation of the monarch from the state (contradicting the inherent notion that the monarch personifies the state) and placed second to it. Like the Ottawa Citizen, the league also questioned the legality of the elimination of the words Her Heirs and Successors according to law—the commitment new citizens make to the succession to the Canadian Crown. Addressing this, both Bills C-16 and C-18 contained a clause stating: "removing the words 'Her Heirs and Successors' does not imply that pledging allegiance to the... Crown ends with the death of the current Queen. Section 35 of the Interpretation Act states that, in every enactment, the phrases 'Her Majesty', 'the Queen', 'the King', or 'the Crown' mean the Sovereign of the United Kingdom, Canada and Her other Realms and Territories, and Head of the Commonwealth. Thus, upon her death, the reference to Queen Elizabeth will automatically be read as a reference to the succeeding monarch."

In 2006, the Fraser Institute issued a report, Canada's Inadequate Response to Terrorism: The Need for Policy Reform, suggesting that the Citizenship Act be amended so that the Oath of Citizenship included a provision wherein the new citizen offered loyalty to Canadian values, with violation of this oath punishable by deportation. The intention of the report's recommendations, penned by David Collacott, was to counter the support immigrants received from official multiculturalism to place the devotions and hostilities of their homeland before their duty to Canada. A University of Toronto law professor, however, opined that the rule of law itself was Canadian value, thus rendering the report as moot.

== Public action ==
=== Legality of the oath ===
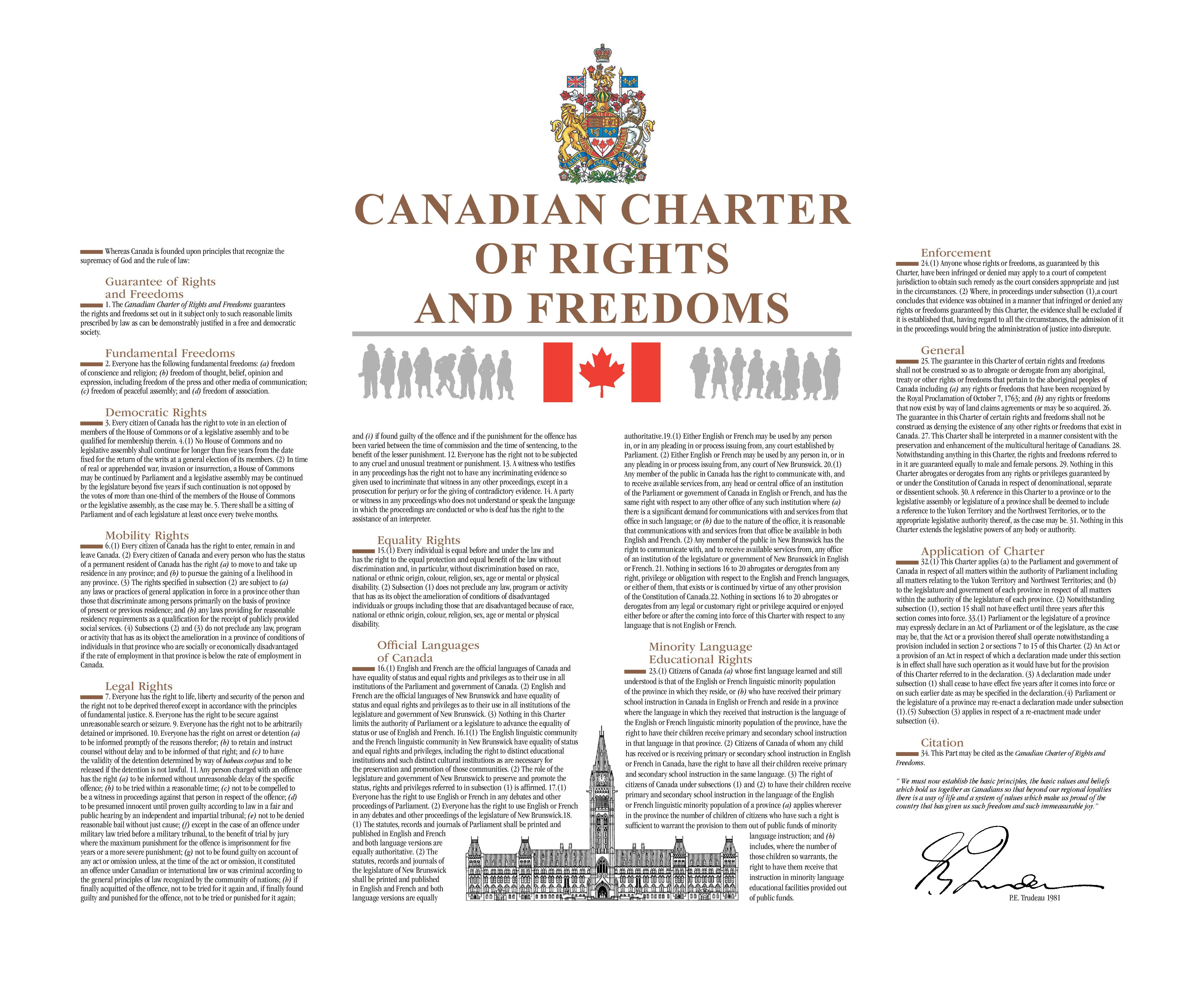
The Canadian Charter of Rights and Freedoms, which was unsuccessfully invoked in a legal challenge against the Oath of Citizenship by lawyer Charles Roach.

Lawyer Charles Roach, a permanent resident of Canada and executive board member of Citizens for a Canadian Republic (CCR) who refused to swear the Oath of Citizenship, attempted through the courts to have struck down the requirement to pledge allegiance to the monarch to obtain citizenship. With the support of his own law firm and CCR, Roach launched a number of suits against the Crown, beginning in 1994, when he argued to the federal court that being forced to take the oath was a violation of clauses 2(b), 2(d), and 15 of the Canadian Charter of Rights and Freedoms. This attempt was unsuccessful, with the majority of the court ruling that "[t]he fact that the oath 'personalizes' one particular constitutional provision has no constitutional relevance, since that personalization is derived from the Constitution itself... Even thus personalized, that part of the Constitution relating to the Queen is amendable, and so its amendment may be freely advocated, consistently with the oath of allegiance, either by expression, by peaceful assembly or by association." Further appeal of this decision to the Supreme Court was denied.

In 2007, Roach, along with three others—Michael McAteer, an Irish immigrant with "republican heritage"; Ashok Charles, an Indo-Canadian professional photographer; and Howard Gomberg, a professional actor and performer from the United States—filed a class action lawsuit in the Ontario Superior Court of Justice, claiming that the requirement to take the Oath of Citizenship not only violated the aforementioned sections of the charter, but also clause 2(a), that relating to freedom of conscience. He stated in the media that requiring black people to swear allegiance to the Canadian sovereign to receive citizenship was akin to forcing Jews to swear an oath to a descendant of Adolf Hitler and said in a letter to his fellow litigants: "If we win this class action, a centuries-old tradition would begin to unravel." Though the federal Crown made two attempts to have the case dismissed as frivolous and vexatious, on 20 February 2008, the Court of Appeal for Ontario approved the proceeding of the case to the Ontario Superior Court. During the proceedings, the Monarchist League of Canada publicly supported the present oath and opposed Roach's actions and media reaction was also negative, with a number of op-ed pieces denouncing Roach's challenges. Roach's case was dismissed by the Ontario Superior Court in January 2009.

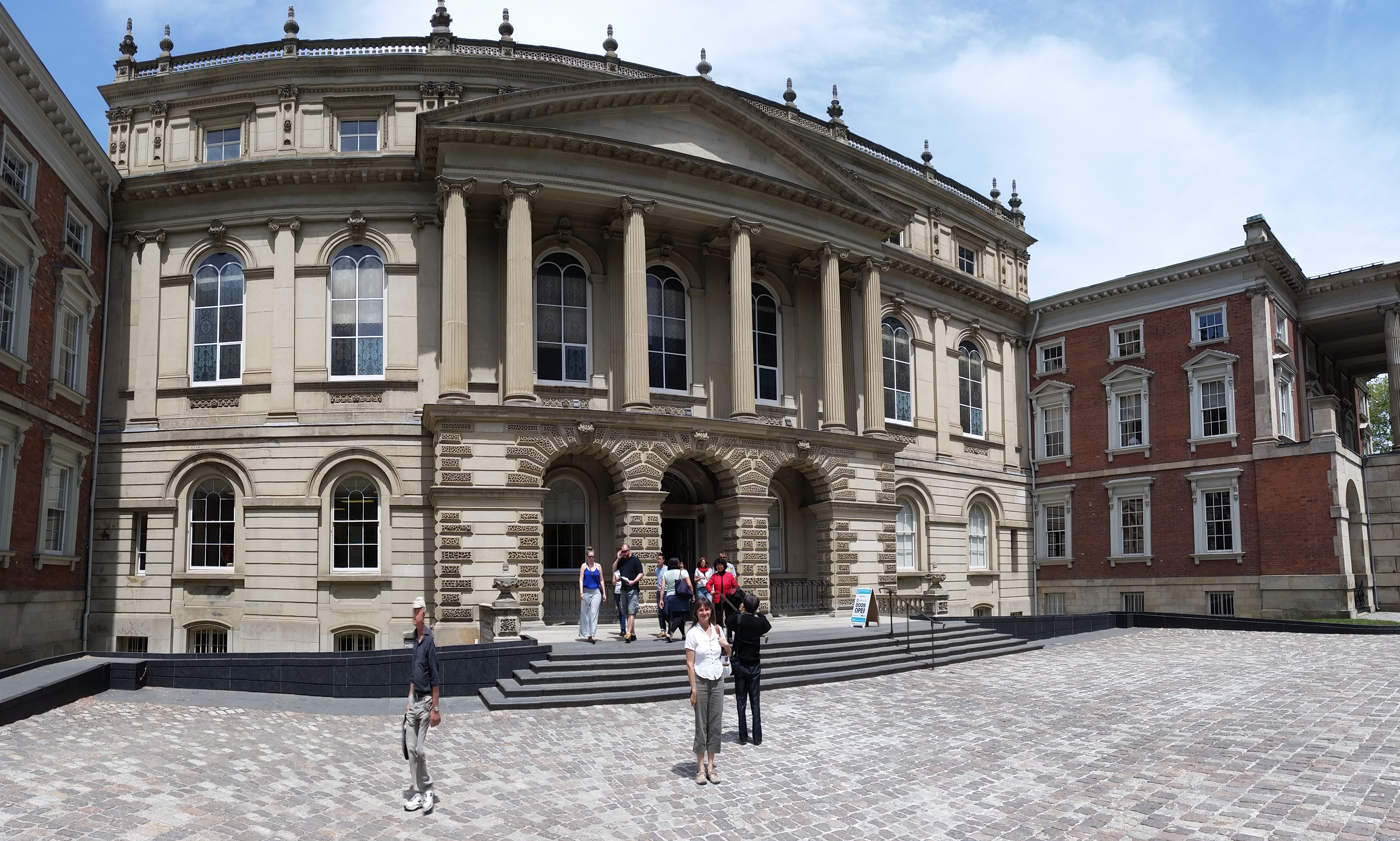
Osgoode Hall, home of the Court of Appeal for Ontario

Roach relaunched the case in 2012 and, on 18 June, the Ontario Superior Court permitted the case's continuance, though Roach died on 2 October of that year. In September 2013, Justice Edward Morgan dismissed the case, stating the oath is "a form of compelled speech", but a limit "on the right of expression that is justifiable in a free and democratic society" and the applicants, who he said showed a misunderstanding of the oath's purpose, would, even after taking the oath, remain "free to oppose the monarch or advocate for its abolition". He further ruled that the oath does not contravene either religious or equality rights. The case was taken again to the Court of Appeal for Ontario, which, in August 2014, upheld the decision of the Superior Court, Justice Karen Weiler stating "[t]he purpose of the oath is not to compel expression... but to obtain a commitment to our form of government from those wishing to become Canadian citizens. If there is a violation of the appellants' rights to freedom of expression, it is justified. Following the ruling, the plaintiffs stated they would seek leave to appeal to the Supreme Court of Canada. Throughout the trial, media commentary was mixed: the Toronto Star called for the oath to be changed so prospective citizens swore allegiance to "Canada" as the symbol of the country's constitutional order, whereas The Globe and Mail, National Post, and Calgary Herald defended the oath as it is. In February 2015, the Supreme Court of Canada refused to hear any further appeal.

=== Controversy with religious face coverings ===
In 2014, Zunera Ishaq, a Toronto resident who wears a niqāb, challenged the regulation that was implemented in 2011 by then Minister of Citizenship and Immigration Jason Kenney requiring those taking the oath to do so without any face covering. She expressed willingness to unveil herself and recite the oath in private, but took offence at the demand she remove her niqāb in a public ceremony. Kenney said veils and masks prevented citizenship ceremony officials from confirming each candidate is speaking the oath, as required by law, and the oath is a "public declaration that you are joining the Canadian family and it must be taken freely and openly." Approximately 100 people are affected annually by the policy, which was supported by the Muslim Canadian Congress, but opposed by the National Council of Canadian Muslims.

The Federal Court ruled on 11 February 2015 in Ishaq's favour. Judge Keith Boswell opined the regulations require citizenship judges administer the oath "allowing the greatest possible freedom in the religious solemnization or the solemn affirmation thereof" and asked how that could be possible if a rule requires candidates to "violate or renounce a basic tenet of their religion". Prime Minister Stephen Harper reacted by stating the following day that the Crown-in-Council would appeal the judgement. However, the Federal Court of Appeal upheld the earlier ruling and refused an application for a stay of proceedings, prompting the Conservative Party to, during the ongoing federal election (in which the niqāb matter became a 'wedge' issue) craft a press release indicating the Cabinet would introduce to parliament "in the days ahead" legislation to ban niqāb at citizenship ceremonies. Ishaq recited the oath privately before a female citizenship judge and became a Canadian citizen on 9 October 2015, though meanwhile, the government pressed the issue to the supreme court. Following the election won by the Liberal Party, the new cabinet withdrew the challenge.

== See also ==
- Canadian nationality law
- History of immigration to Canada
- Immigration to Canada
