= Black Action Defence Committee =

Canadian anti-racist activist group

- Formation: 1988; 38 years ago Canada
- Founders: Dudley Laws; Charles Roach; Sherona Hall; Lennox Farrell

The Black Action Defence Committee (BADC) is a Canadian activist group founded by Dudley Laws, Charles Roach, Sherona Hall and Lennox Farrell, with Laws as the group's chair. It was founded in 1988 in response to the killing of Lester Donaldson, which was the latest in a series of police shootings of Black men in Toronto since the late 1970s. Among its several accomplishments, the BADC was primarily responsible for the creation of Ontario's Special Investigations Unit (SIU). The BADC organized demonstrations and called for an end to "police investigating police", which had become the norm when police shootings previously occurred. Still in effect, the SIU investigates incidents involving police shootings.

== Foundation ==
Before the Black Lives Matter movement, BADC was the main Black Left association in the city of Toronto that rose out of many years of battles against supremacist police severity during the 1970s and ‘80s.

Established in 1988, because of a series of murders of Black men by police officers such as Buddy Evans, Albert Johnson, Michael Wade Lawson, Lester Donaldson, this association is committed to battling brutality and prejudice in the criminal impartialness plan through community regulation and preparation. The association received a lot of help from different sorts of individuals, all things considered, who challenged and requested equality and justice.

In the early 1990s, Dudely Laws filled in as the head and face of the association, he arranged many protests during his time with the BADC. He was described as someone who had an unmistakable look with his well-known grey beard and dark beret, working enthusiastically for BADC's goal.

One protest, in particular, pulled in more than one thousand participants organized by BADC in order to indicate support for the Los Angeles Rodney King Rebellion. The protest arose out of the exoneration of the police officers for their brutal assault on African-American citizen Rodney King.

== Founding members ==
=== Dudley Laws ===
A welder and mechanic by trade, Dudley Laws emigrated in 1955 to the United Kingdom and ended up associated in the West Indian community by fighting for them. In 1965, he migrated to Toronto, Canada, where he filled in as a welder and taxi driver. He joined the Universal African Improvement Association.

He was best known for his complete determination against police violence toward individuals from the Black community, poor Whites, First Nation, and persecuted individuals domestically and globally.

Dudley Laws died on March 24, 2011, after fighting cancer and kidney disease.

Before dying, Laws stated: "For many years, the Black Action Defence Committee has been at the forefront of the struggle for the establishment of an Independent Civilian Oversight to investigate police misconduct. Although the government has called many commissions of inquiries, which have recommended the establishment of such a body, the government is reluctant to do so. It is my opinion, and the opinion of others in and outside of our community, that if such a body is established, and citizens of Ontario and Canada have the means by which to make complaints on police abuse, this would greatly improve the relationship between the African-Canadian community and the police."

=== Charles Roach ===
Charles Roach, a veteran social equality legal counsellor and activist whose last cause was his unsuccessful bid to become a Canadian citizen without swearing allegiance to the Queen, which he declared was unlawful.

Born in Trinidad and Tobago, Roach moved to Toronto and lived there for over 50 years, his name synonymous with the advancement of human rights.

He was an associate at Roach and Schwartz Associates, a law office on St. Clair Avenue that, throughout the years, grasped an extensive variety of liberal and left-wing causes. Never more so than during the 1980s, when a string of prominent police shootings in the Toronto area prompted the provincial Task Force on Policing and Race Relations, which thus created Ontario's civilian-staffed Special Investigations Unit (SIU).

The 1978 passing of Buddy Evans was pursued the following year by the executing of Albert Johnson, and both incited wide anger in Toronto's black community. However, it was with the killing of Lester Donaldson in 1988 by a Toronto police officer, and the demise around the same time in Peel Region of a young man Wade Lawson that the pressure for police change accumulated pace.

Alongside his activist companion Dudley Laws, whom he would later defend on criminal accusations, Roach's voice was one of the most intense.

Charles Roach died at age 79 after a long fight with brain cancer.

=== Sherona Hall ===
Sherona Hall lived to encourage other individuals and battled to make Canada, her adored Caribbean and Africa an increasingly impartial community for all.

She died on December 30, 2006, at age 59 while sleeping, but she was not found for three days.

She was engaged with the freedom battles in Mozambique, Guinea-Bissau, Zimbabwe; the battle against politically sanctioned racial segregation in South Africa, protesting the homicides by the racist routine of individuals in the South African towns of Soweto and Sharpeville.

Throughout the years, Sherona touched numerous lives, regardless of whether it be the Black Action Defence Committee, labour battles, the International Women's Day Committee, women's activist associations, HIV and AIDS, lesbian, gay, androgynous, and transgender communities. She additionally gave her time and earnings to African Heritage Month and to Kwanzaa festivities. She was energetic about the prosperity of young people. Just before she died, she filled in as a community youth advocate with the Toronto Housing Authority.

Toronto lawyer Aston Hall is like as Sherona Hall, a result of the Democratic Socialist movement driven by Michael Manley in Jamaica in the late 1960s. Aston Hall stated: "She was one of the true believers and the fire she brought to the process of change in Jamaica, she also brought to the community in Toronto when she moved here.”

=== Lennox Farrell ===
As a resigned educator, writer, publisher, and community coordinator, Lennox Farrell was and is among those fighting for positive and required the social change in Toronto since the 1980s, particularly, yet not only concerning issues affecting the Black community and kids.

Lennox was entangled with numerous community associations including chair, Ontario Anti-racism Committee; Caribbean Cultural Committee for Caribana in 2005.

He was a member of the North York Black Education Committee (NYBEC) that for over a 3-year time frame, met on more than one hundred events consulting with the North York Board of Education on issues in the education concerning Black youth. He battled for more prominent police responsibility, and for decency in the media inclusion concerning the depiction of Black youth.

Farrell has received many awards and honours such as: I Who's Who in Black Canada (1st & 2nd editions, 2000 & 2006), Canada Annual Centennial Medal (1995); Jane-Finch Community Award (1995, ‘89, ‘80); Provincial Award for “Merit in Teaching”, Ontario English Catholic Teachers Association (1993).

== Strategies ==
=== The SIU ===
Laws' main goal was to make Toronto police accountable. BADC's continuous demand for action prompted significant police change in 1990 with the making of Ontario's Special Investigations Unit (SIU), an autonomous body that examines police shootings. The SIU, is a free non military personnel oversight agency with the power and control to research police occurrences where damage or demise is the result. Beforehand, the police examined their own misconduct, something many considered a conflict of interest. The SIU is a program that not many had ever seen before in Canada and is the climax of numerous long periods of expression in Toronto.

=== The Freedom Cipher ===
The Black Action Defence Committee also created The Freedom Cipher. Its creation was to supply Black working-class youth with employable abilities like gang-exit strategies in the public sector. Additionally, instructions for the youths to grow into academic individuals who could then arrange a progressive Black Liberation shift in the African-Canadian society.

The Freedom Cipher program was also intended to be an enemy of prejudice venture, which was mainly actualized by Chris Harris during 2007 to 2009 at the Black Action Defence Committee to prepare the newly Black intellectual youth (socialist activists) who work against hostile bigotry, anticapitalist, and Black Feminist association in African-Canadian society.

Harris mentions that if the Freedom Cipher is to prevail in the schooling of natural intelligent in the time to come, it should be situated in communist/socialist party building associations outside of the NonProfit Industrial Complex (NPIC).

== Action and events ==
=== Bill 105 ===
In October 1996, the legislature appointed Rod McLeod, an attorney with extensive Tory associations, to "consider and advise on how the current system of civilian oversight of police in the province can be improved" and to report back five weeks after the fact. In January 1997 An Act to Review the Partnership Between the Province, Municipalities and the Police and to Enhance Community Safety (Bill 105) was discharged While a large portion of McLeod's particular proposals were not embraced, two of his primary standards comprised significant subjects in Bill 105.

Right off the bat, without any contribution from the community, McLeod unmistakably endeavoured to tip the balance toward favouring police points of view on external control and order. He further presumes that "[t]he current laws are highly technical, confusing and amount to over-regulation." McLeod also incorporated the "local collective bargaining unit" as having an important position in the civilian framework.

When Bill 105 was declared there was one door of opportunity for any significance for community reaction, through formal hearings in front of the Legislative Committee. In their accommodation before the committee, the Ontario Association of Chiefs of Police made no reference to citizen oversight, this was an implicit support of the proposed bill. Of those demonstrations which specifically tended to the proposed revisions to the handling of public complaints against the police, basically all condemned them.

The Canadian Civil Liberties Association presented that: "Under Bill 105 the successor commission will be virtually bereft of investigative powers, so it will be a system of complete police self-investigation… Bill 105 will threaten to exacerbate the very tensions - racial, ethnic, class- that brought about the changes that so many have worked so hard to create."

The Black Action Defence Committee argued that "Bill 105 totally destroys the principles of police accountability, accessibility, fairness and impartiality." Even the President of the Metropolitan Toronto Police Association communicated worry that an absolutely interior process would eliminate any administration responsibility on how investigations are led.

The Ombudsman of Ontario noticed how the "new" framework echoes from the past. She expressed that the proposed changes were "cause for very serious concern…Bill 105, as currently drafted, represents a step backwards" All things considered, there were scarcely any, noteworthy changes to the corrections to the practice methods proposed in Bill 105 before it was passed into law on November 27, 1997.

Bill 105 (RSO) "An Act to review the Partnership between the province, municipalities and the police and to enhance community safety" was announced by the Legislative Assembly. The changes in Bill 105 reexamined the Police Services Act and specifically made another framework to manage the inside order and open grievances.

=== Riot ===
'Racism' and 'Canada' are united in a way that clashes with the country's recognizable compassionate image: many people don't relate race riots with Canada, however certain African Canadian community grow towards becoming hyper-visible when a protest goes out of control in Toronto.

Author Andrew Moodie published a play Riot in 1997. Riot's plot is based on events that occurred three years previous to its debut. The Los Angeles riots started on 29 April 1992, in light of the Rodney King preliminary decision, and kept going until 2 May, when calm started to be reestablished.

The Yonge Street riots in Toronto started on 4 May 1992, when roughly a thousand people accumulated outside the American Consulate for a protest coordinated by the Black Action Defence Committee. It started as a tranquil march against the LAPD officers' exoneration, yet was aroused by the way that the end of the week earlier, a twenty-two-year-old black man, Raymond Constantine Lawrence, was shot by Metro police Constable Robert Rice. The march proceeded to the intersection at Yonge and Bloor Streets, where protestors sat for forty-five minutes, tuning in to discourses. The primary site of protest at that point moved to Nathan Phillips Square.

Thirty individuals invaded the old city hall courthouse's pounding glass, trailed by a few hundred individuals who started to plunder stores. Police were pelted with rocks and eggs. The violence proceeded until 11 pm when the protestors scattered. Amid that first day, an expected thirty-two arrest were made. The following day, many young people conflicted with police downtown, yet 250 police officers on foot and horses controlled the circumstance and made twenty-two arrests. There were a couple of more occurrences on the consequent two evenings, however, police split them up before any further violence resulted.

To some degree, the play Riot assumes that the viewers have knowledge in regards to these events: its riot isn't narrative in essence, rather it investigates the ramifications of such occasions for the African Canadian community.

=== ROM Protest ===
There were many individuals who were given to the social elements of Pan-Africanism, examples of others who embraced inquiries of justing in the development of the BADC are as Dudley Laws, Milton Blake, Akua Benjamin and Dari Meade. In protests against the Royal Ontario Museum's supremacist Into the Heart of Africa (1989), there are people like Stephanie Payne and Lennox Farrell and various anonymous understudies were an extension among cultural and political Pan-Africanists.

Many black artists joined that battle and in addition led their own battles, challenging the bigot and exclusionary practices of major art institutions. They protested the Into the Heart of Africa show at the Royal Ontario Museum as well as the production of Showboat at the North York Center for the Performing Arts.

In November 2016, the Royal Ontario Museum (ROM) finally apologized for adding hostility to African racism in a questionable show almost three decades prior. The display, called Into the Heart of Africa, occurred in 1989 and highlighted objects and pictures gathered by troopers and evangelists – including one very disagreeable magazine cover demonstrating a British officer diving a sword into the chest of a Zulu warrior. At the time, the centre's staff said that the show was designed as a basic perspective of Canadian evangelists and troopers who went to Africa in Victorian and Edwardian occasions. In any case, individuals from Toronto's black community condemned the show as racist, saying it conveyed agony to black Canadians in light of the manner in which it depicted Africans while worshipping colonialism.

During an event on a Wednesday evening in November 2016, the historical centre's deputy director of collections and research, Mark Engstrom, communicated "deep regret" for the display and its effect on black Canadians. He said the display coincidentally "perpetuated an atmosphere of racism and the effect of the exhibition itself was racist." The statement of regret was appreciated by the Coalition for the Truth about Africa, a gathering that at first framed to challenge the show. Representative Rostant Rico John said it took endurance to get to an understanding following 27 years. But within the group of the Coalition for the Truth about Africa, a portion of its individuals still feel attacked and hurt by the display.

The show is currently held up in classrooms for instance of what administrators ought not to do, said Matt Brower, a teacher of museum studies at the University of Toronto. "It was an enormous failure," said Brower of the display. Administrators wanted the display to demonstrate that the things being introduced "were not being endorsed." It was meant to be a paradoxical take at how the things showed entered the museum – through damaging colonial connections. "And yet when people came in, they saw the Zulu warrior being impaled. They saw the missionary woman teaching Africans how to wash, and they didn’t see any irony,” he stated.

The show incited challenges at the time, amid which three individuals were harmed and eight individuals were charged in a debate among protestor and police. Protestors requested that the display be closed down, however, the ROM did not want to do it. "Every museum in Canada would hit the roof if we closed the show because it would mean that any group could close a show," said Cuyler Young, the museum director at the time in 1990.

In 2015, – 25 years after Into the Heart of Africa finished – the Royal Ontario Museum propelled another program about Africa. Of Africa is a three-year venture that incorporates various shows in lasting displays and in addition, transitory shows proposed to demonstrate the complexities and assorted variety that exist on the African mainland. The exhibition hall additionally said it would find a way to fortify its ties with the African-Canadian communities.
