= Domestic =

Domestic may refer to:

== In the home ==
- Anything relating to the human home or family
  - A domestic animal, one that has undergone domestication
  - A domestic appliance, or home appliance
  - A domestic partnership
  - Domestic science, sometimes called family and consumer science
  - Domestic violence
  - A domestic worker

== In the state ==
- Domestic affairs, matters relating to the internal government of a Sovereign state
- Domestic airport
- Domestic flight
- Domestic policy, the internal policy of a state

== Other ==
- Domestic, Indiana, an unincorporated community in Wells County
- Domestikos (English: the Domestic), a Byzantine title
  - Domestic of the Schools, commander-in-chief of the Byzantine army in the 9th-11th centuries
- Domestic (film), a 2012 Romanian comedy film

== See also ==
- Domestic discipline (disambiguation)
- Housekeeper (disambiguation)
