= Jeff Rosenthal =

Canadian statistician and author (born 1967)

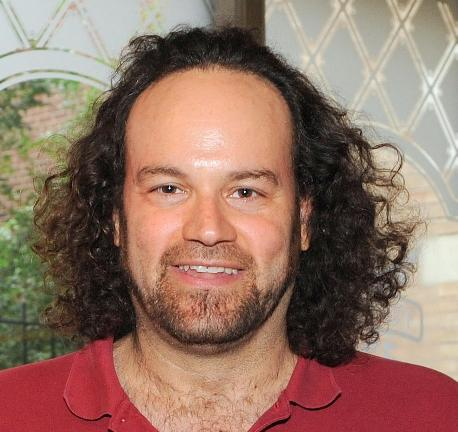
- Born: Jeffrey Seth Rosenthal; October 13, 1967 (age 59); Scarborough, Ontario, Canada
- Education: University of Toronto (BSc); Harvard University (PhD)
- Spouse: Margaret Fulford (m. 1999)
- Parents: Peter Rosenthal (father); Helen Stephanie Rosenthal (mother)
- Relatives: Robert Fulford (father-in-law)
- Awards: COPSS Presidents' Award (2007)
- Scientific career
- Fields: Probability theory, Computational statistics
- Workplaces: University of Minnesota; University of Toronto
- Thesis: Rates of convergence for Gibbs sampler and other Markov chains (1992)
- Doctoral advisor: Persi Diaconis
- Doctoral students: Alison Gibbs
- Website: probability.ca

Jeffrey Seth Rosenthal FRSC FIMS (born October 13, 1967) is a Canadian statistician and nonfiction author. He is a professor in the University of Toronto's department of statistics, cross-appointed with its department of mathematics.

== Education and career ==
Rosenthal graduated from Woburn Collegiate Institute in 1984, and received his B.Sc. (in mathematics, physics, and computer science) from the University of Toronto in 1988, and his Ph.D. in mathematics ("Rates of Convergence for Gibbs Sampler and Other Markov Chains") from Harvard University in 1992, supervised by Persi Diaconis. He was an assistant professor in the Department of Mathematics at the University of Minnesota from 1992 to 1993. Rosenthal began his career in the Department of Statistics at the University of Toronto as an assistant professor in 1993, became an associate professor in 1997, and has been a full professor since 2000. Rosenthal has written numerous research papers about the theory of Markov chain Monte Carlo and other statistical computation algorithms, many joint with Gareth O. Roberts. He has also written a graduate textbook on probability theory and co-authored an undergraduate textbook on probability and statistics, and supervised numerous student research projects.

== Public engagements ==
In 2005 Rosenthal wrote a book for the general public, Struck by Lightning: The Curious World of Probabilities, which was a bestseller in Canada and has been published in ten languages. He has been interviewed by the media about such diverse topics as crime statistics, pedestrian deaths, gambling probabilities, and television game shows, and has appeared on William Shatner's Weird or What?. His Wired Q&A video received 2.5 million views.

In 2006, Rosenthal did the statistical analysis used by the Canadian Broadcasting Corporation television news magazine The Fifth Estate to expose the Ontario lottery retailer fraud scandal, which was debated in the Ontario provincial legislature. In 2010 his research with Albert H. Yoon about the U.S. Supreme Court was quoted in The New York Times. His statistical analysis refuted suspicions by former world chess champion Vladimir Kramnik about Hikaru Nakamura's long online chess winning streaks. He has also written about the Monty Hall problem.

== Honors and awards ==
Rosenthal received the CRM-SSC Prize in 2006, the COPSS Presidents' Award in 2007, the Statistical Society of Canada Gold Medal in 2013, and a Faculty of Arts & Science Outstanding Teaching Award in 1998. He was elected a Fellow of the Institute of Mathematical Statistics in 2005, and of the Royal Society of Canada in 2012.

== Personal life ==
Rosenthal's father Peter Rosenthal (1941–2024) and mother Helen Stephanie Rosenthal (1942–2017) were originally from Queens, New York City. They emigrated to Canada in 1967 where both of them became math professors at the University of Toronto.

Besides his research, Rosenthal performs music and improvisational comedy, including at The Bad Dog Theatre Company. He performed musical accompaniment for the sketch comedy show Middle Raged by Geri Hall and Gary Pearson.

Jeffrey Rosenthal is married to Margaret Fulford, who is the University College Librarian. His father-in-law was journalist Robert Fulford.

== Bibliography ==
- Duanmu, Haosui; Rosenthal, Jeffrey S.; Weiss, William (2021). Ergodicity of markov processes via nonstandard analysis. American Mathematical Society. ISBN 978-1-4704-6813-2. OCLC 1284944707.
- Rosenthal, Jeffrey S. (2019). A first look at stochastic processes. New Jersey: World Scientific. ISBN 978-981-12-0790-7. OCLC 1107856889.
- Rosenthal, Jeffrey S. (2018). Knock on wood: luck, chance, and the meaning of everything. Toronto, Ontario, Canada: HarperCollins. ISBN 978-1-4434-5307-3. OCLC 1047653556.
- Evans, Michael; Rosenthal, Jeffrey S. (2010). Probability and statistics: the science of uncertainty (2nd ed.). New York: W.H. Freeman and Co. ISBN 978-1-4292-2462-8. OCLC 473463742.
- Rosenthal, Jeffrey S. (2006). A first look at rigorous probability theory (2nd ed.). Singapore: World Scientific. ISBN 981-270-371-3. OCLC 81144993.
- Rosenthal, Jeffrey S. (2006). Struck by lightning: the curious world of probabilities. Washington, DC: Joseph Henry Press. ISBN 0-309-09737-1. OCLC 62742569.
