= Housekeeping (disambiguation) =

Housekeeping is the act of cleaning the rooms and furnishings of a home.

Housekeeping may also refer to:

== Homes and buildings ==
- Homemaking, a mainly American term for the management of a home
- Housekeeper (domestic worker), an individual responsible for the cleaning and maintenance of the interior of a residence
- Janitor, a professional who takes care of institutional buildings

== Entertainment ==
- Housekeeping, a 2001 film by Janeane Garofalo
- Housekeeping (novel), a 1980 novel by Marilynne Robinson
  - Housekeeping (film), a 1987 adaptation of the novel, starring Christine Lahti
- "Housekeeping" (NCIS), an episode of NCIS

== Biology ==
- Housekeeping gene, a gene which maintains basic cellular functions

== Technology ==
- Housekeeping (computing), several types of maintenance routines or processes
- Maintenance, repair, and operations, or "housekeeping", in the context of spacecraft operations and other fields

== See also ==
- Housekeeper (disambiguation)
