= Sherona Hall =

Jamaican civil rights activists

Sherona Hall (26 April 1948 – 30 December 2006) was a Jamaican civil rights activist, focussing on the Black community. She was also one of the four founders of the Black Action Defence Committee.

Hall grew up in Jamaica, and was affected at a young age by the instructing of civil rights activist Marcus Garvey. In her home nation, she became particularly associated with community activism, and upon her migration to Canada, she campaigned for the rights of Black communities.

Hall was the youngest secretary of a People's National Party group and at age 15 was one of the establishing individuals for its youth association.

== Life ==
=== In global affairs ===
Hall was associated with the freedom battles in Guinea-Bissau, Mozambique, Zimbabwe, and the battle against politically-sanctioned racial segregation in South Africa, dissenting the homicides in Sharpeville and Soweto, South Africa.

Hall supported the Movimento Popular de Liberaçao de Angola (MPLA), the South Africa's African National Congress (ANC), and the African Liberation Day Support Committee because she supported their movements and their desireto free Africans from expansionism. She also offered her assistance to the Cuban revolt because she was a supporter of the Grenadian uprising.

In the mid 1970s, a period of political and social agitation, Hall travelled to Tanzania to participate in the Sixth Pan-African Congress. Once in the country, she expended her contacts to incorporate officials from the government of different African nations and manufactured her own political associations with freedom fighters and pioneers.

Hall was additionally a Black women's activist and lobbyist who worked to achieve change in Black communities.

=== In Canada ===
By the 1970s she was engaged with Toronto's black network. She also filled in as a court columnist in Toronto, eventually opening her own firm. She additionally worked for Toronto Housing Authority as a youth advocate for the community.

As a court reporter, Hall was both in and out of the legal framework in Toronto. Her job in the court enabled her to study the involvement of young, Black men in the legal system. This moved her to begin her activism for legal reform.

From 2004 until her death, she worked with other defenders from the community of Malvern and St. James Town, trying to help take out the criminal records of black young men who had been accused of minor wrongdoings. She also helped educate them about their constitutional rights.

=== Black Action Defence Committee ===
The Black Action Defence Committee (BADC), which Hall co-founded, is a main Black Left association in the city of Toronto that originated from local activism against police brutality during the 1970s and 1980s.

=== Death ===
She died at the age of 59 on December 30, 2006. In acknowledgment of Hall's service to the people of Jamaica, Jamaican Prime Minister, Portia Simpson, sent her sympathies.
