= Alison Gibbs =

Canadian statistician

Alison Lee Gibbs is a Canadian statistician and statistics educator. She directs the Centre for Teaching Support and Innovation at the University of Toronto, where she is a professor (teaching stream).

== Education and career ==
Gibbs majored in applied mathematics at the University of Waterloo, graduating in 1988. She received a second bachelor's degree in secondary school education at Western University in 1989, and became a secondary school mathematics teacher. Returning to graduate education in statistics at the University of Toronto, she received a master's degree in 1992 and completed her Ph.D. in 1999. Her doctoral dissertation, Convergence of Markov Chain Monte Carlo Algorithms with Applications to Image Restoration, was supervised by Jeff Rosenthal.

Next, she became a postdoctoral researcher and then assistant professor at York University. She returned to the University of Toronto as a lecturer and senior lecturer from 2002 to 2006. In 2006, she became an associate professor (teaching stream), and she was promoted to professor (teaching stream) in 2018, one of the first people to receive this type of promotion at the University of Toronto. She was named as the director of the Centre for Teaching Support and Innovation in 2020.

== Recognition ==
Gibbs was a 2018 3M Teaching Fellow. She became an Elected Member of the International Statistical Institute in 2023, and was the 2023 recipient of the Distinguished Educator Award of the Statistical Society of Canada.

== Selected publications ==
- Gibbs, Alison L.; Su, Francis Edward (December 2002), "On choosing and bounding probability metrics", International Statistical Review, 70 (3): 419–435, arXiv:math/0209021, Bibcode:2002ISRv...70..419G, doi:10.1111/j.1751-5823.2002.tb00178.x
- Gibbs, Alison L. (December 2004), "Convergence in the Wasserstein metric for Markov chain Monte Carlo algorithms with applications to image restoration", Stochastic Models, 20 (4): 473–492, doi:10.1081/stm-200033117
- Gil, Einat; Gibbs, Alison L. (November 2017), "Promoting modeling and covariational reasoning among secondary school students in the context of big data", Statistics Education Research Journal, 16 (2): 163–190, doi:10.52041/Serj.V16I2.189
