= Housekeeper =

Housekeeper may refer to:

- Housekeeper (domestic worker), a person heading up domestic maintenance
- "House Keeper" (song), 1996 song by Men of Vizion
- The Housekeeper, upcoming film by Richard Eyre
- Maid, a female with various domestic duties
- Janitor, a person responsible for institutional maintenance
- A person engaged in housekeeping

== See also ==
- Housekeeping (disambiguation)
