= Charles Roach =

Canadian civil rights lawyer and activist

Charles Conliff Mende Roach
- Born: September 18, 1933; Belmont, Port of Spain, Trinidad and Tobago
- Died: October 2, 2012 (aged 79); Toronto, Ontario, Canada
- Occupation: Lawyer

Charles Conliff Mende Roach (September 18, 1933 – October 2, 2012) was a Canadian civil rights lawyer and an activist in the Black community in Toronto.

== Early life ==
Born in Belmont, Trinidad and Tobago, the son of a trade union organizer, Roach arrived in Canada in 1955 as an aspiring priest to study at the University of Saskatchewan. Roach was politicized by the civil rights movement, stating: "after the '50s, I started being more political... This was the spirit of the times. I'm really from the civil-rights era." He then studied law at the University of Toronto and was called to the bar in 1963.

== Activism and law ==
Roach worked as a staff lawyer for the city of Toronto in the 1960s, while also participating and organizing marches and demonstrations for equal rights. He opened his own law practice in 1968, eventually becoming the firm of Roach and Schwartz Associates. Among his clients were Black Panthers attempting to seek refuge in Canada from prosecution in the United States and other asylum seekers. He also represented domestic workers being deported in the 1970s. He further became a vocal critic of the police, accusing them of racism. In 1999, Roach went to Rwanda to represent Hutu journalist Mathieu Ngirumpatse against human rights abuse charges before the International Criminal Tribunal for Rwanda.

Through his work, Roach became a leading figure in Toronto's Black community. He was a founder of the Caribana festival, serving as its first chair. Roach further established the Movement of Minority Electors in 1978 to encourage non-caucasians to enter electoral politics and was a founding member of the Black Action Defence Committee.

== Republican advocacy ==
Roach was a member of the executive committee of Citizens for a Canadian Republic (CCR) and commented publicly on his desire to end the Canadian monarchy. He was a permanent resident of Canada, not obtaining Canadian citizenship because of his refusal to swear the Oath of Citizenship, as it contains a promise to bear allegiance to the Canadian monarch. Roach swore allegiance to the Queen of Canada twice before: once as a reservist in the 1950s, and again when he was called to the Bar.

In 1992, Roach argued in the Federal Court of Canada that the Canadian oath for new citizens, which includes a statement of allegiance to the Canadian monarch, was a violation of the Charter of Rights and Freedoms. The court ruled against his motion to have the requirement to take the oath struck down and his appeal to the Supreme Court was dismissed.

In 2007, Roach again sued, this time as a class action. On May 17, 2007, Justice Edward Belobaba of the Ontario Superior Court ruled that Roach could proceed with the lawsuit, dismissing a Crown motion to have the action quashed as frivolous and vexatious. On February 19, 2008, the appeal by the federal government was dismissed by judges at the Court of Appeal for Ontario and the case went before the Ontario Superior Court. Roach's case was dismissed by the court in January, 2009.

Roach again went to the courts in 2012 with another class action suit to argue the oath of allegiance to the sovereign is unconstitutional. On June 18, the Ontario Superior Court permitted the case's continuance. The case was dismissed in September, 2013.

== Death ==
Roach died from malignant brain cancer on October 2, 2012, in Toronto.

A laneway in Toronto was named Charley Roach Lane in his honour in 2018.

== Publications ==
- Roach, Charles (1977). Root for the Ravens: Poems for Drum and Freedom. Toronto: NC Press. ISBN 978-0-919600-80-5.
- Roach, Charles (2012). "Resisting the State: Canadian History Through the Stories of Activists". In Neigh, Scott (ed.). Canada on Trial. Talking Radical. Fernwood. ISBN 978-1-55266-520-6.
