= Ontario Coalition Against Poverty =

Canadian homeless activist group

- Logo
- Abbreviation: OCAP
- Formation: 1990
- Dissolved: 2023
- Region served: Ontario, Canada
- Official language: English, French
- Website: ocap.ca

The Ontario Coalition Against Poverty (OCAP) was an anti-poverty group in Ontario, Canada, which promoted the interests of the poor and homeless. The group used publicity-generating direct action techniques such as squatting and demonstrations which could be confrontational, for example the 2000 Queen's Park protest. On May 13, 2023, OCAP decided at its annual general meeting to cease operations.

== Composition and early history ==
The coalition was founded in 1989 by activists in the Toronto Union of Unemployed Workers, coming out of a mass "March Against Poverty". The coalition officially began its operations in 1990 with the premise of promoting concern and action around poverty, homelessness, and gentrification in downtown Toronto. The group was headquartered in Toronto.

== Queen's Park protest and aftermath ==
On June 15, 2000, OCAP staged a large demonstration on the lawn at Queen's Park in Toronto, during which violent altercations took place between the demonstrators and security officials, police officers, and police horses. The protestors were asking to address the Ontario Legislature in order to demand a repeal of the new Tenant Protection Act which limited tenant rights, to demand increased social housing, to demand an end to the Safe Streets Act which was targeting the homeless and poor, and to reverse the 21.5% cut to welfare payments instituted by the Conservative government. The protestors, which included large numbers of homeless people directly affected by Premier Mike Harris' policies, tore up cobblestones to use as projectiles.

Mayor Mel Lastman, the Toronto Police Services Board and the Toronto Police Association argued that the police response was proportionate, but seventeen community groups which included Ontario Public Service Employees Union, Parkdale Community Legal Services and the National Action Committee on the Status of Women called for an inquiry to be made by the Ontario Civilian Commission on Police Services.

In the aftermath, upwards of 40 people were arrested and charged, including three high-profile OCAP members — John Clarke, Gaetan Heroux and Stefan Pilipa. The defence argued that videos demonstrated police brutality. The eventual trial of these three was declared by the presiding judge to be a mistrial due to a hung jury. The Crown dropped the charges against Heroux and Pilipa but elected to proceed again against Clarke. All charges against Clarke were eventually dropped when a judge threw them out owing to the Crown's failure to disclose evidence expeditiously.

Charges against most other defendants had mixed results; most were either acquitted or had their charges dropped. In all, however, the crown attorney in conjunction with the Toronto police spent over two years on these cases. In the early 2000s, OCAP's activities were denounced by union bureaucrats and some public officials who have objected to their tactics.

== Flaherty eviction ==
OCAP evicted the Ontario Finance Minister Jim Flaherty from his constituency office in Whitby in June, 2001. By this action, OCAP wanted to demonstrate opposition to Flaherty's policies and to show him personally the effects of being evicted. Office furniture was damaged and some OCAP members were arrested. In response, the Canadian Auto Workers union cancelled its funding for the group.

== Pope squat ==
OCAP squatted a house in Parkdale at 1510 King Street West, in July 2002. South Parkdale was undergoing a gentrification process and OCAP had identified 35 longterm empty properties. The selected building was chosen because the ownership was in limbo between the city and the province. It was called the Pope squat because of the concurrent visit of Pope John Paul II. The squat was well supported by figures such as Jack Layton and Naomi Klein and the city council passed a motion suggesting the building be converted into affordable housing, but it was evicted in November 2002 by the province.

== Diet allowance ==
OCAP noticed in 2005 that the Ontario Works social assistance regulations mandated doctors prescribing a diet allowance to people who were claiming welfare benefits. Working with doctors such as Gary Bloch, OCAP ensured people were informed about the allowance. In 2006, the provincial government decided that only people with specific illnesses could be prescribed the allowance.

== Metro Hall occupation ==
In March 2013, OCAP occupied Metro Hall in a protest action designed to highlight the overcrowding of homeless shelters in Toronto. This overcrowding was partly a result of the eviction of Occupy Toronto the previous year.

== Coronavirus concerns ==
On March 18, 2020, OCAP called for the city of Toronto to repurpose empty buildings into shelter for homeless people so as to minimise the effects of the coronavirus pandemic.

== See also ==
- Poverty in Canada
