= John Clarke (activist) =

Canadian anti-poverty activist

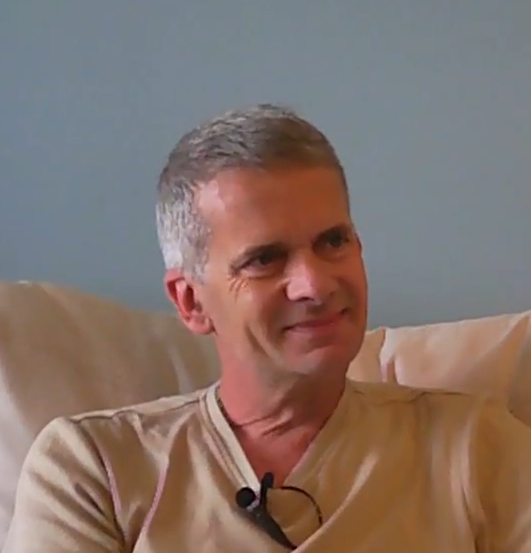
Clarke in 2013

John Clarke is an anti-poverty activist who lives in Toronto, Ontario, Canada.

== Activism ==
A native of Britain, he moved to Toronto, Ontario and became an organizer there. He was a leading figure of the Ontario Coalition Against Poverty (OCAP) group until he retired from it in January 2019. The Globe and Mail reported in the year 2000 that Clarke's "guerrilla activism has pitted him against police countless times during the past decade."

Clarke was arrested with three other activists and charged with inciting a riot for his role in an OCAP protest at Queen's park in June 2000. Clarke appealed his restrictive bail conditions in August 2000. In 2003, a judge stayed the charges and Clarke walked free.

The Sudbury Star described Clarke in 2016 as "a 25-year veteran of activism." In 2019, he announced an online fundraiser asking people to contribute $25,000 for his retirement.

== Teaching ==
In 2019, Clarke took on a two-year post as Packer Visitor in Social Justice in the faculty of Liberal Arts and Professional Studies at York University.
