= Citizenship judge =

Citizenship Judge
- Immigration, Refugees and Citizenship Canada
- Style: Judge [name]
- Member of: Citizenship Commission
- Appointer: Governor General-in-Council
- Constituting instrument: Citizenship Act
- Website: Citizenship Commission

The Citizenship Commission is an administrative tribunal within Immigration, Refugees and Citizenship Canada (IRCC).

The overall mandate of the Commission is to assess referred applications to ensure they meet the physical-presence requirements for Canadian citizenship; and to facilitate citizenship ceremonies to administer Oaths of Citizenship for successful applicants.

The Commission consists of independent decision-makers called citizenship judges—officials who fulfill the mandate of the Citizenship Commission. Unlike Justice of the peace, citizenship judges are not judicial officers. The decision-making role of citizenship judges will cease on July 31, 2027, unless it is further extended by the Minister before that date.

== Citizenship judge ==
A citizenship judge is an official in Canada who assesses referred applications to ensure, that they meet the physical presence requirements for Canadian citizenship and presides over citizenship ceremonies to administer the Oath of Citizenship for successful applicants. Citizenship judges also speak to community groups, schools, and other audiences about the process to become a citizen, as well as Canadian values and the rights and responsibilities of Canadian citizenship.

Regulations require that during a citizenship ceremony a citizenship judge shall: emphasize the significance of the ceremony as a milestone in the lives of the new citizens; administer the oath of citizenship with dignity and solemnity, allowing the greatest possible freedom in the religious solemnization or the solemn affirmation thereof; personally present certificates of citizenship, unless otherwise directed by the Minister; and promote good citizenship, including respect for the law, the exercise of the right to vote, participation in community affairs and intergroup understanding.

In regards to decisions that affect individual cases, citizenship judges are independent decision-makers, and unlike Justice of the peace, citizenship judges are not judicial officers. Their decisions can be judicially reviewed by a failed applicant or the Minister of Citizenship and Immigration. Rather than Your Honour, citizenship judges are addressed as Judge [name].

Citizenship judges are appointed in accordance with the Citizenship Act by the Governor General-in-Council on the recommendation of Minister of Immigration, Refugees and Citizenship. Any Canadian citizen may submit their candidacy if they meet the requisite criteria.

Citizenship judges, as of May 2026
Judge	Location	Appointment level
Suzanne Carrière	St. Adolphe, Manitoba	Full-time
Anthony Blair	Brampton, Ontario	Full-time
Clover, James	Edmonton, Alberta	Full-time
Carol-Ann Hart	North Vancouver, British Columbia	Full-time
Rochelle Ivri	Niagara-on-the-Lake, Ontario	Part-time
Joan K. Mahoney	Halifax, Nova Scotia	Full-time
Rania Sfeir	Kirkland, Quebec	Full-time
Rodney Simmons	Toronto, Ontario	Full-time
Marie Senécal-Tremblay	Montreal, Quebec	Full-time
Albert Wong	Toronto, Ontario	Full-time

=== Regalia ===
Citizenship judges wear a black judicial gown with a burgundy accent. A heraldic badge is worn on the right, and official national awards may be worn on the left. Judicial tabs are worn with a white wing collar shirt.

== See also ==
- Canadian nationality law
- Canadian Citizenship Test
