= Dudley Laws =

Canadian civil rights activist (1934–2011)

Dudley Laws

Dudley Laws (May 7, 1934 – March 24, 2011) was a Canadian civil rights activist and executive director of the Black Action Defence Committee.

Laws was born in Saint Thomas Parish, Jamaica, to parents Ezekiel and Agatha Laws, and was a brother to six other siblings.

A welder and mechanic by trade, he worked at Standard Engineering Works until he emigrated to the United Kingdom in 1955 and became involved in defending the West Indian community. He influenced the development and launch of the Somerleyton and Geneva Road Association in Brixton and also joined the Standing Conference of the West Indies and the St Johns Inter-Racial Club. In 1965, he relocated to Toronto, Ontario, Canada, where he worked as a welder and taxi driver. He joined the Universal Negro Improvement Association, a Garveyite organization.

Laws became prominent in the 1970s and 1980s as a critic of the then Metropolitan Toronto Police Force, due to a number of young black men being shot by police constables, as well as levelling other allegations of racist practices against the police. He was also prominent as an advocate for immigrants and refugees and worked as an immigration consultant in the 1990s.

In 1988, he founded the Black Action Defence Committee following the police shooting of Lester Donaldson.

In later years, Laws maintained a better relationship with Toronto Police and was friends with two former Deputy Chiefs (Keith D. Forde and Peter Sloly).

Laws died in Toronto of kidney disease on March 24, 2011, and interred at Glenview Memorial Gardens.

In 1991 police arrested Mr. Laws and charged him with conspiring to smuggle illegal immigrants in and out of Canada. He was convicted and fined, but the Ontario Court of Appeal ordered a new trial after learning that the trial judge had met privately with prosecutors. The Crown later stayed the charges.
