= Monument to the Lion of Judah =

Historic statue in Addis Ababa, Ethiopia

Coordinates: 9°00′39″N 38°45′11″E

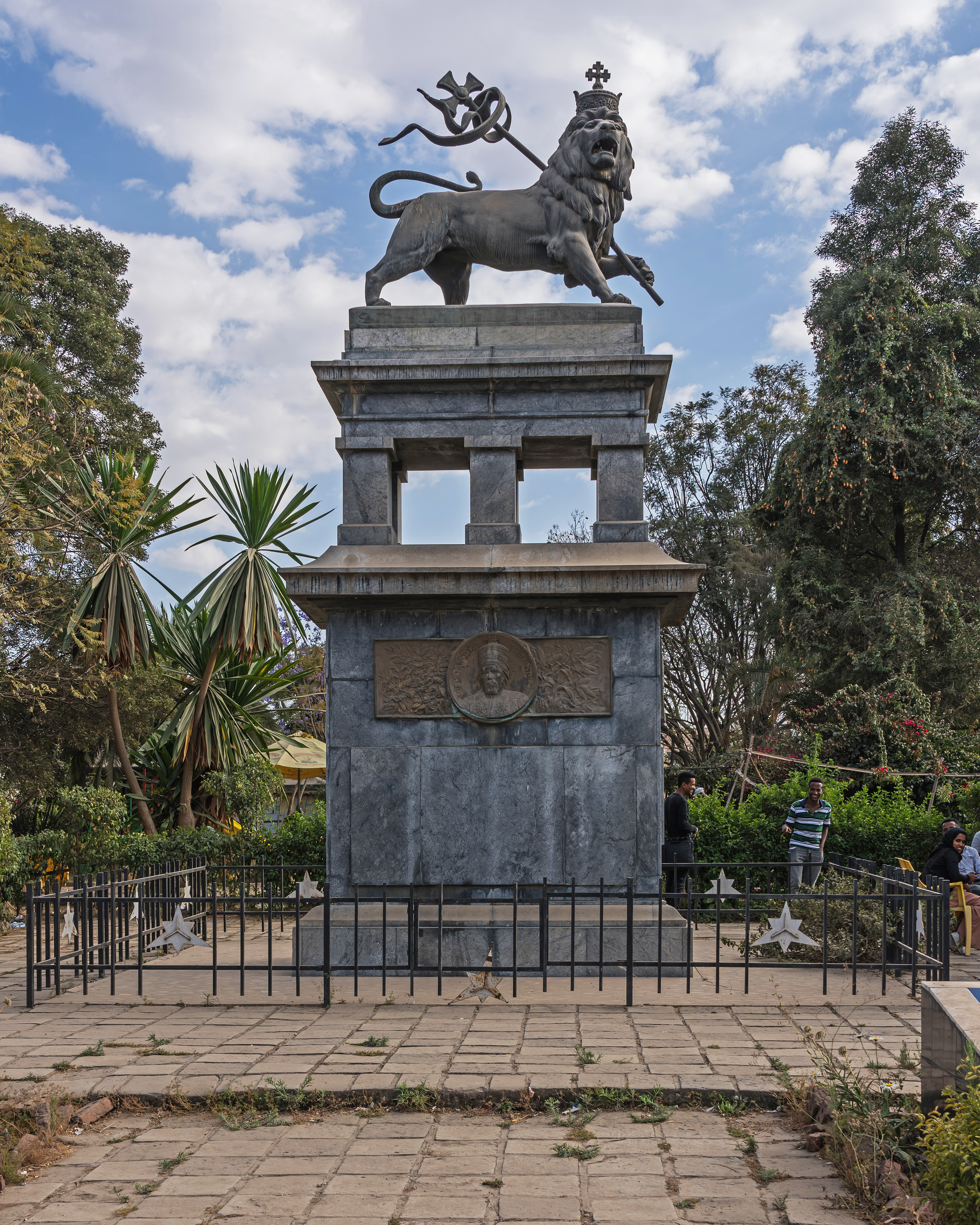
- Artist: Georges Gardet
- Year: 1930
- Type: Sculpture
- Medium: Gilded bronze
- Location: Addis Ababa, Ethiopia

The monument to the Lion of Judah is a statue of the Lion of Judah, a symbol of Ethiopian Emperors and Ethiopia, and is located in Addis Ababa.

== History ==
The monument is located in the square of the Addis Ababa railway station in Addis Ababa and marks the end of Winston Churchill Avenue, one of the main arteries of the city. The sculpture of the Lion of Judah, in gilded bronze, is placed on a black granite pedestal decorated with relief portraits of emperors Menelik II and Haile Selassie, Empress Zewditu, and Ras Makonnen Wolde Mikael. The work was made by the French sculptor Georges Gardet in 1930, on the occasion of the coronation of Emperor Haile Selassie on 2 November 1930. After the 1974 revolution, the Derg regime thought of removing the monument, a symbol of the monarchy. However, an association of Arbegnoch veterans claimed that it was a memory of Ethiopian antifascist resistance and a symbol of Ethiopia. Therefore, the regime agreed to leave the monument, which is still in front of the Addis Ababa central station. In 1954, a new monument was commissioned by Emperor Haile Selassie from sculptor Maurice Calka, around the National Bank of Ethiopia and the National Theater.

=== 1935: Looted by Fascist Italian force ===
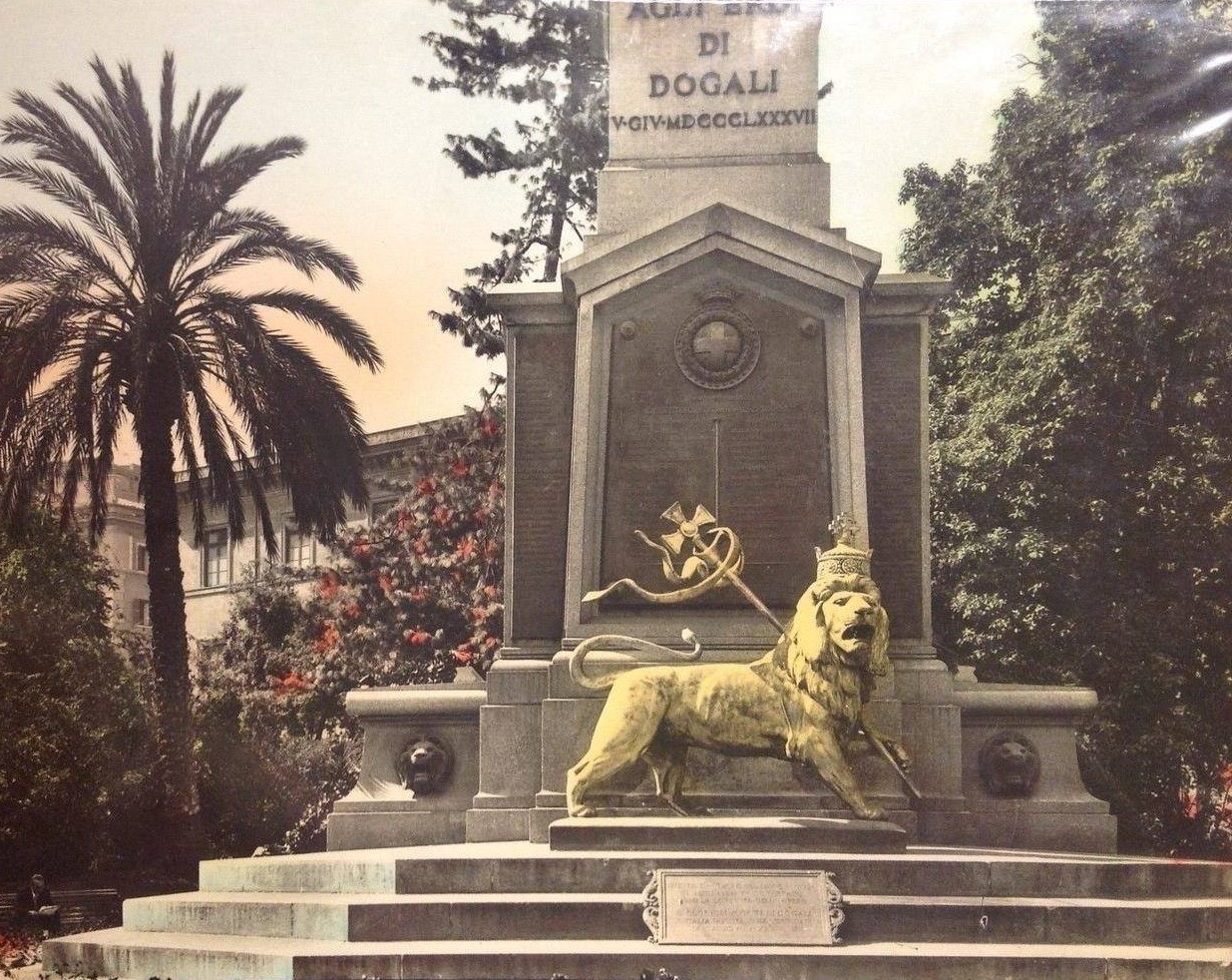
The Lion of Judah at the obelisk to the fallen of Battle of Dogali in Rome, Italy

At the end of the so-called March of the Iron Will (Italian: marcia della ferrea volontà) (during the Second Italo-Ethiopian War) that led to the occupation of Addis Ababa by the Royal Italian Army, the statue was transported to Rome, Italy in 1936 at the end of the Second Italo-Ethiopian War.

On 8 May 1937, on the occasion of the first anniversary of the proclamation of the Italian Empire and Italian East Africa, the Lion of Judah sculpture was placed just beyond Square of Five hundred to Rome, under the obelisk that remembers of the Battle of Dogali.

The Lion of Judah statue remained in Rome until the 1960s, when it was returned to Ethiopia after the negotiations in Addis Ababa. Emperor Haile Selassie took part in the new inauguration ceremony in military uniform, also recalling the patriotic gesture of Zerai Derres.

=== Zerai Derres rebellion ===
On 15 June 1938, the young Eritrean Zerai Deres made a protest against the Italian occupation of Ethiopia in front of the monument. Brandishing a scimitar, he wounded several onlookers and was shot by soldiers. He was arrested by the fascist militia and imprisoned in a psychiatric hospital (however, contemporary Italian historians doubt the claim that he was mentally unstable) in Sicily, where he died in 1945. For this gesture Zerai Deres is considered a national hero both in Eritrea and Ethiopia.

== Filmography ==
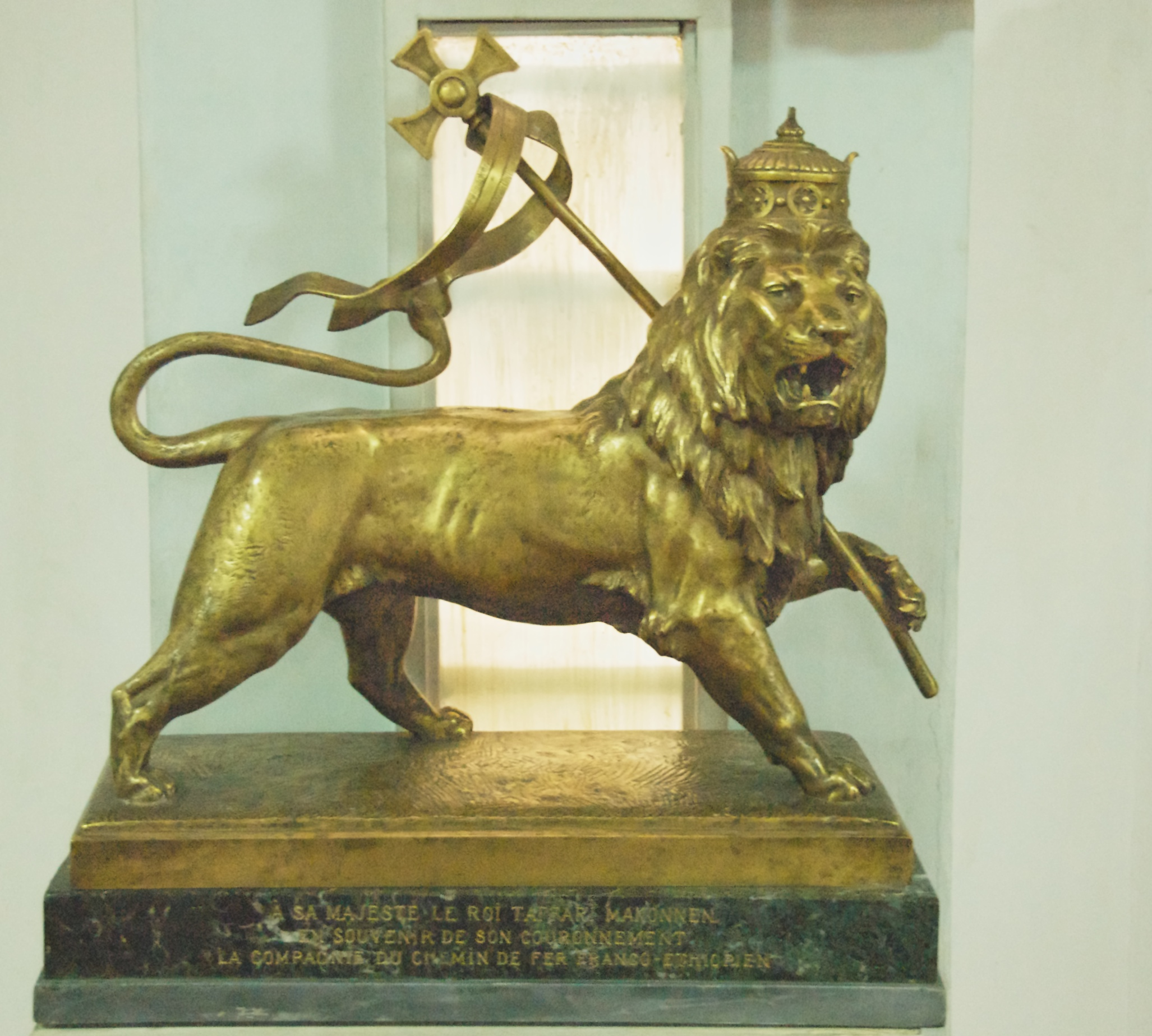
The Lion of Judah sculpture in the collection of the National Museum of Ethiopia.

- The Lion of Judah, life and Reign of Haile Selassie I (Roland van Reenen) on YouTube (19 January 2012)
- The Lion of Judah, Prince Ermias Sahle Selsssie (LibraryOfCongress) on YouTube (3 April 2011)
- Monuments of Addis Ababa, EthiopiaIl (Ethiopian TV) on YouTube (7 March 2013)
- Il leone di Giuda (Cinegiornale Luce) on YouTube (3 March 1937)
- Scoperto il Leone di Giuda portato da Addis Abeba (Cinegiornale Luce) on YouTube (12 May 1937)

== See also ==
- Ethiopian Empire
- Ethiopian aristocratic and court titles
- Solomonic dynasty
- Kebra Nagast
