= Georges Gardet =

French painter

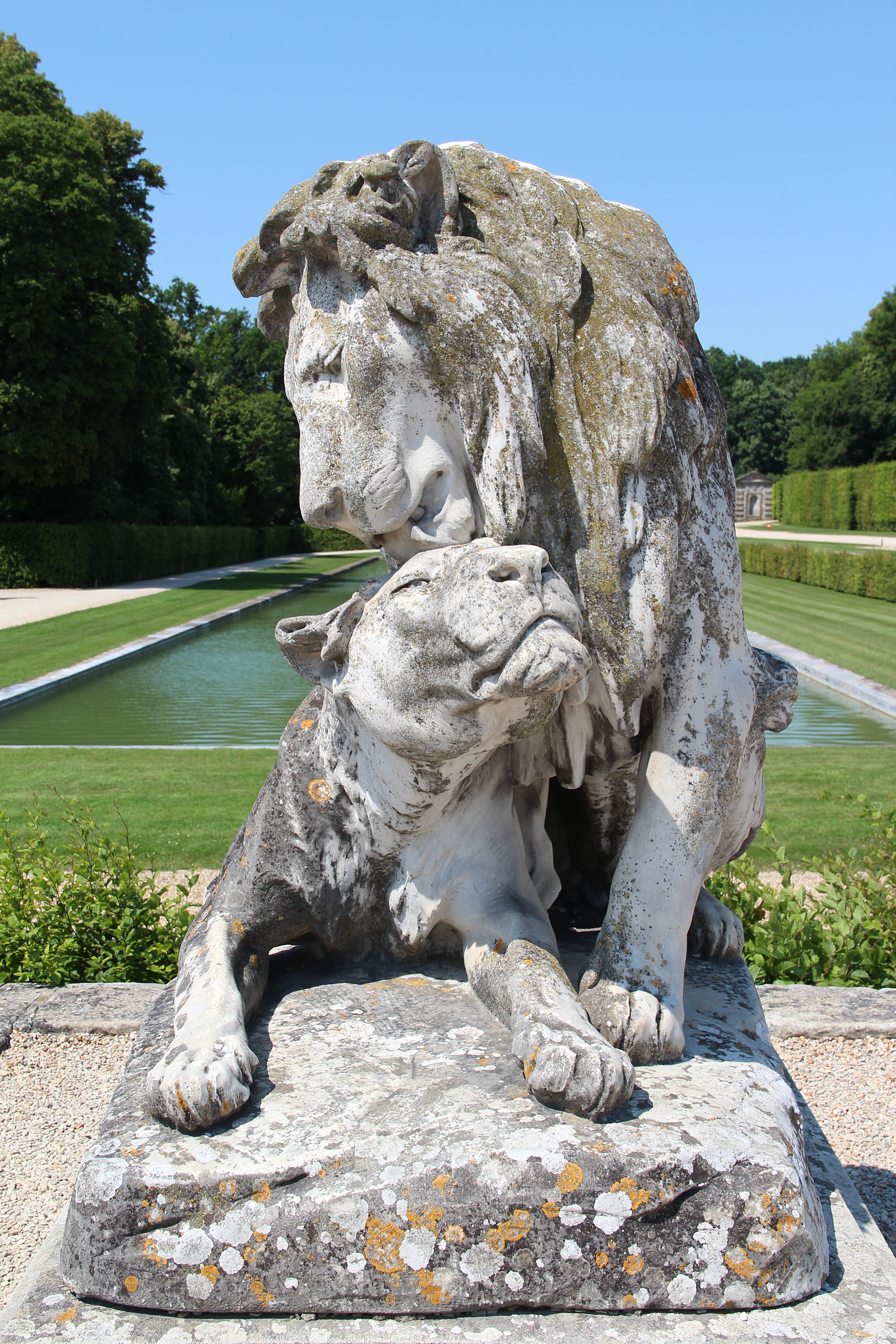
Le Lion et la Lionne, gardens of the Vaux-le-Vicomte castel, Maincy (Seine-et-Marne)

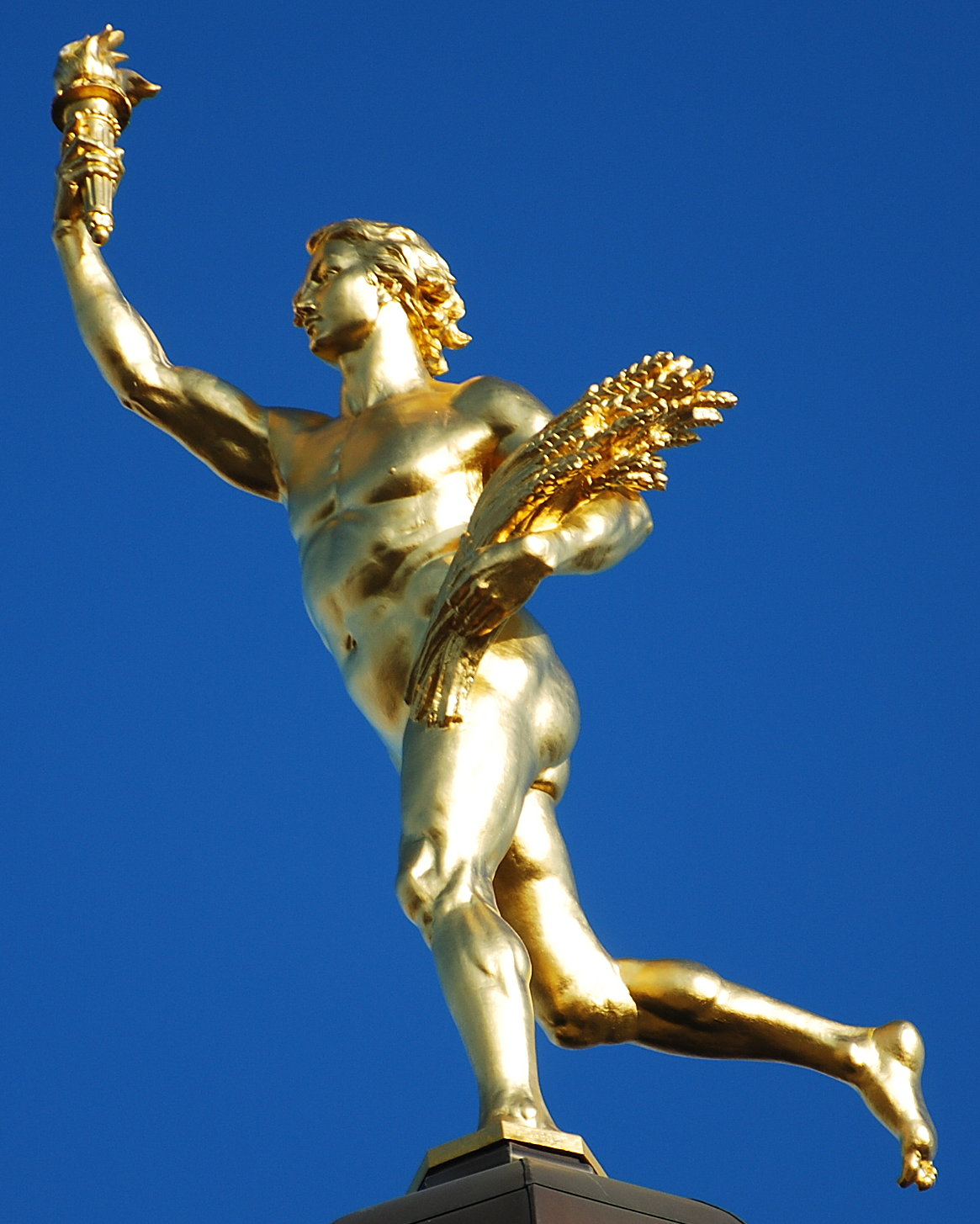
Eternal Youth, finial figure for the Manitoba Legislative Building, Winnipeg

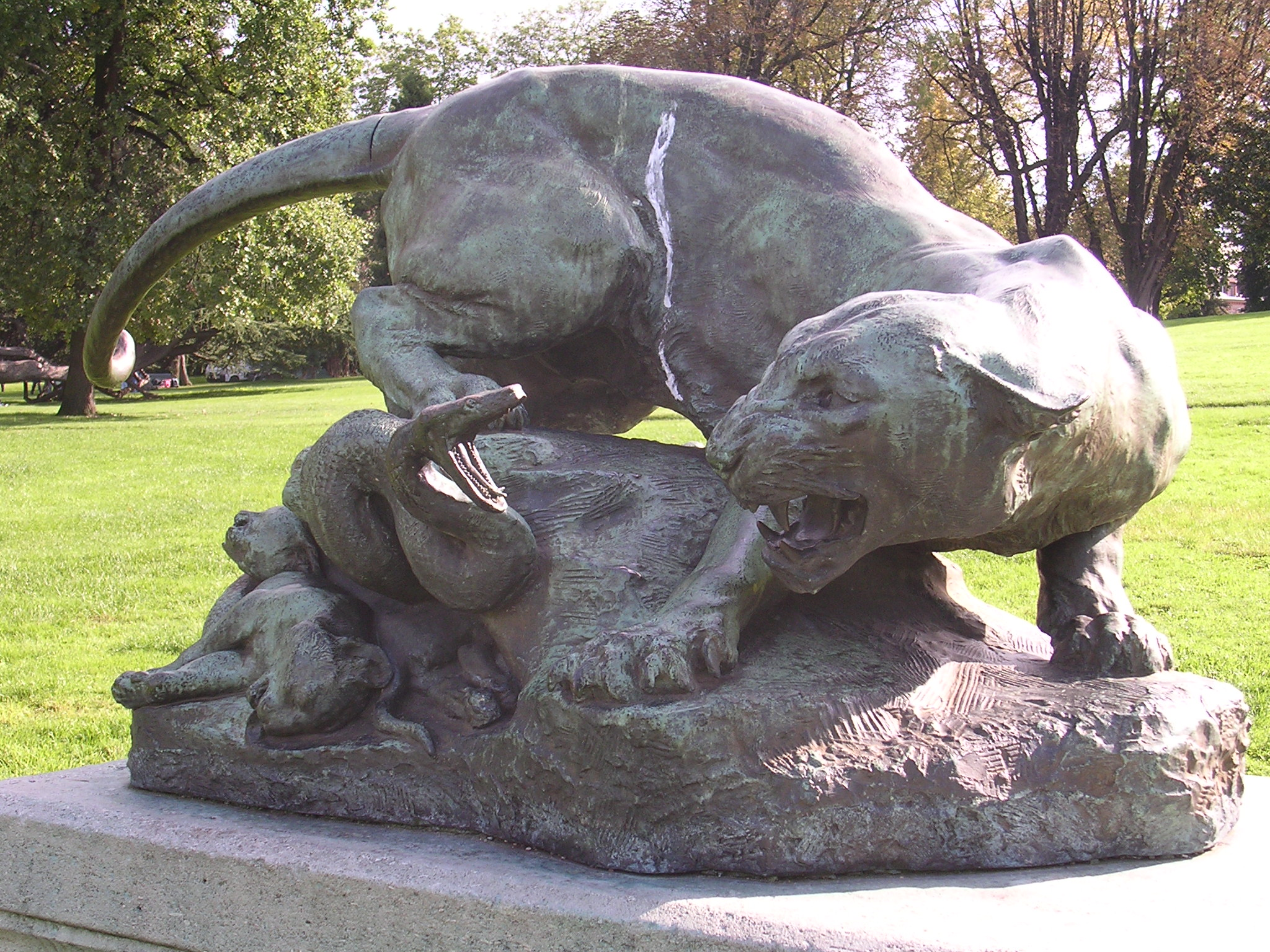
Drama in the Desert, Parc Montsouris

Georges Gardet (11 October 1863 – 6 February 1939) was a French sculptor and animalier.

== Biography ==
The son of a sculptor, Gardet attended the École des Beaux-Arts in the atelier of Aimé Millet and Emmanuel Fremiet (another noted animalier). Gardet's wife Madeleine was the sister of painter and decorator Jean Francis Auburtin, who collaborated with Gardet on work for the Parisian Exposition Universelle (1900).

Gardet was made an Officer of the Legion of Honor in 1900, and was a member of the Académie des Beaux-Arts, and the Society of French Artists.

== Work ==
- bronze Drama of the Desert, Parc Montsouris, Paris, 1891
- two animal groups (tiger attacking buffalo, leopard catching a turtle) flanking the entrance to the Musée des Sciences of Laval, France, 1892
- lion groups at the Pont Alexandre III, Paris, circa 1900
- lions at the Jardin du Luxembourg, Paris
- six bronze crocodiles (or "sea monsters") surrounding the base of monument The Triumph of Republic by Jules Dalou, Place de la Nation, added in 1908, scrapped by the Germans in 1941
- Monument to the Lion of Judah, Addis Ababa, Ethiopia
- gilded finial figure Eternal Youth, along with two bison flanking the grand staircase inside, for the Manitoba Legislative Building, Winnipeg, 1918
- two groups of deer for the grounds of the Château de Sceaux in Sceaux, Hauts-de-Seine (outside Paris), 1933
- bronze lion on the grounds of St. Mark's School, Southborough, Massachusetts
- bronze bison, Harris Circle at east entrance to Pioneers Park, Lincoln, Nebraska installed April 14–15, 1930 and dedicated May 17, 1930
