= Zerai Deres =

Eritrean anti-fascist revolutionary (1914–1945)

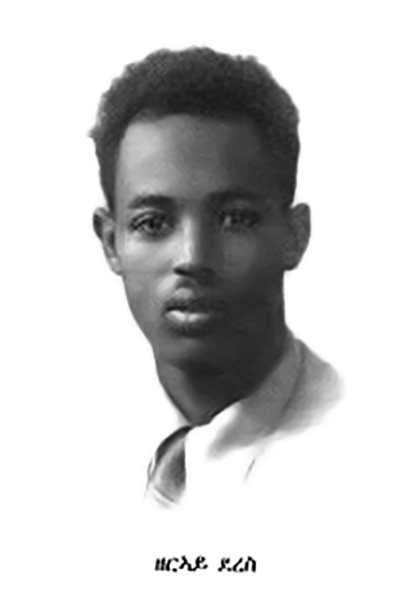
- Born: 1 March 1915; Adihiyis, Serae, Italian Eritrea
- Died: 6 July 1945 (aged 30); Barcellona Pozzo di Gotto, Sicily, Kingdom of Italy
- Resting place: Hazega, Central Region, Eritrea
- Monuments: Zerai Deres Square, Asmara, Eritrea

Zerai Deres (Ge'ez: ዘርኣይ ደረስ; 1 March 1915 – 6 July 1945) was an Eritrean revolutionary and translator. In 1938, he engaged in an act of public devotion to an important symbol of his native country, the Monument to the Lion of Judah, at the time kept in Rome. When interrupted, he violently protested against Italian colonialism while brandishing a scimitar, which led to his arrest and internment in a psychiatric hospital for seven years, until his death. However, contemporary Italian historians doubt the claim that he was mentally unstable. Zerai's protest, lionized after the end of the Second World War, is considered by Eritrean and Ethiopian historiography as part of the movement against Italian occupation. To this day, Zerai is considered a legend and a folk hero of anticolonialism and anti-fascism both in Eritrea and Ethiopia.

== Biography ==
=== Early life and education ===
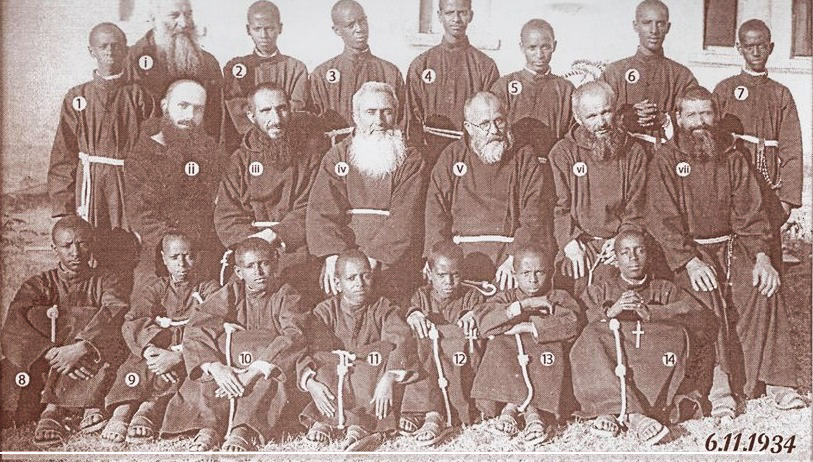
First Eritrean young Capuchin seminarists with their teachers in Segeneiti on November 6, 1934. During the seminar Zerai Deres (fourth from left on the top, with number 3) took the name of Francesco da Adiyeheys

Zerai Deres was born in the kebele of Adihiyis, in the province of Serae, in Italian Eritrea in 1915 (or 1908, according to the Ethiopian calendar). At the age of two, his father died and the family moved to Hazega, the village of his mother's origin.

Zerai was a member of the Tigrinya ethnic group. He converted to Catholicism and attended Italian colonial schools, including the seminary of the Capuchin friars in Segeneiti. For this reason, he spoke the Italian language fluently. Abandoning his studies in the seminary, Zerai became an interpreter in Rama, an Ethiopian town bordering present-day Eritrea.

On October 6, 1936, Zerai Deres sent a letter to the editor of the Italian newspaper Corriere Eritreo who had written an editorial in which he had asked for the abolition of any form of promiscuity with the "natives". Signing himself Un indigeno (Italian for "A native"), Zerai wrote:

The natives, whose presence causes so much disgust to you, often take pride in the fact that they are Italian subjects. In Libya, Somalia and in the recent war against their homeland, in foreign struggles, they have shielded you with their bodies, and sometimes paid with their lives. I can assure you that it is no exaggeration to say that the natives provided you the means with which you could overcome. The misinterpretation of so many merits and acts of heroism carried out for Italy can only be indicative of an essentially alien and imperial government.

Before departing to Italy, Zerai married in April 1937.

=== Arrival in Rome ===
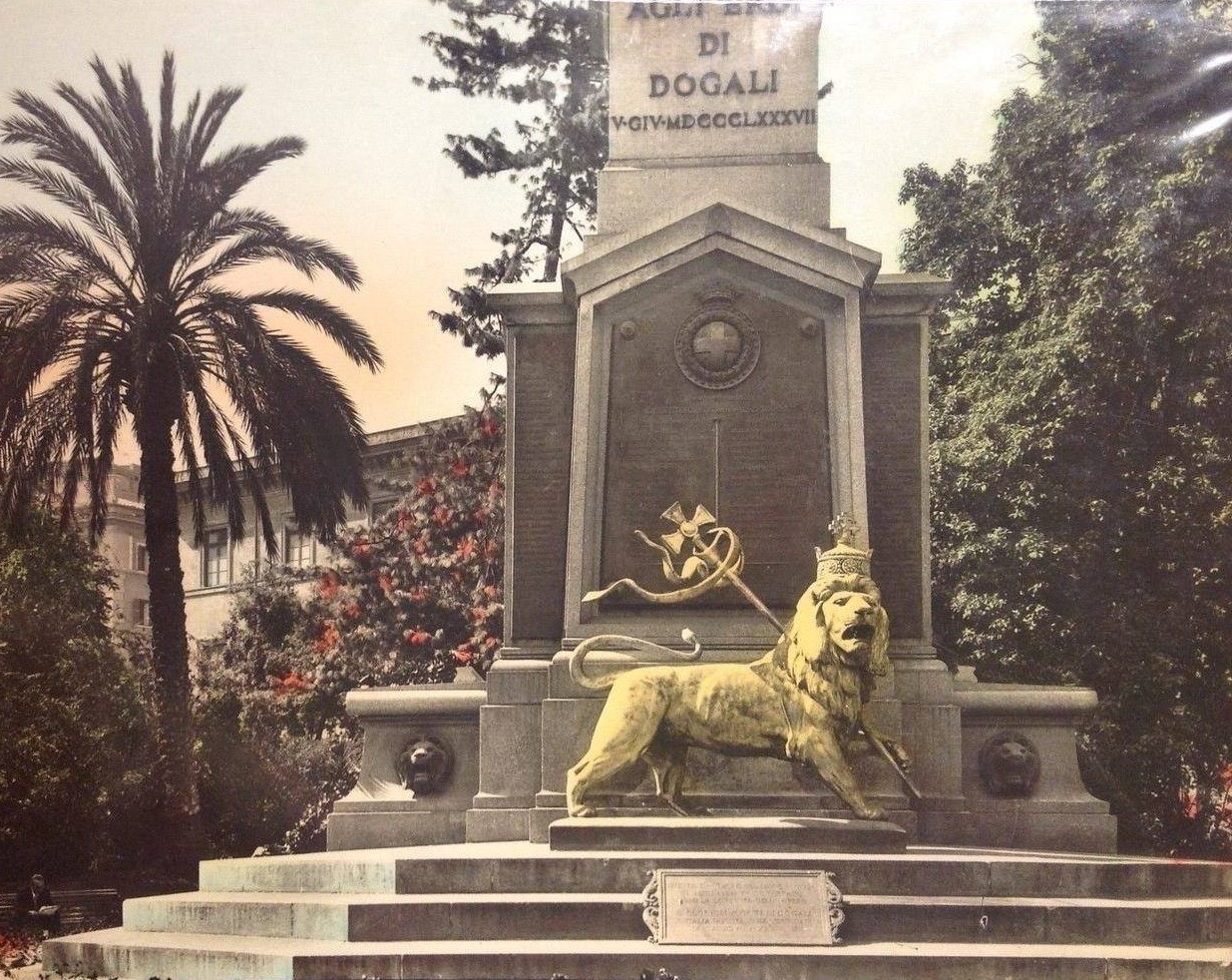
Monument to the Lion of Judah at the Rome memorial to the fallen of the Battle of Dogali, before its repatriation

On 19 February 1937, two Eritreans made a failed assassination attempt on Rodolfo Graziani, the Viceroy of Italian East Africa and appointed Governor-General of Shewa during the Italian occupation of Ethiopia. In return, under carte blanche permission from the Federal Secretary Guido Cortese, many Italian civilians, members of the military, and the paramilitary forces known as the Blackshirts conducted a three-day bloody reprisal in Addis Ababa. Known in Ethiopia as the Yekatit 12 massacre, it resulted in the killing of thousands of people and arrests of many Amhara aristocratic noblemen, about 400 of whom were subsequently deported to Rome, Longobucco, Mercogliano, Ponza, Tivoli, and Asinara, Italy.

In order to manage the deportation, the Italian Ministry of the Colonies hired many people, including Zerai Deres as a translator for Ethiopian nobles deported to Italy. At the age of 23, Zerai arrived in Rome in the summer of 1937 shortly after the arrival of the first Ethiopian deportees. During his stay in the Italian capital, Zerai closely followed the events of the colonial war with a growing sense of anger and helplessness in the face of news coming from Ethiopia, and translated for the Abyssinian Ras the news reported by the Italian press.

=== Lion of Judah incident ===
Lion of Judah incident in the news

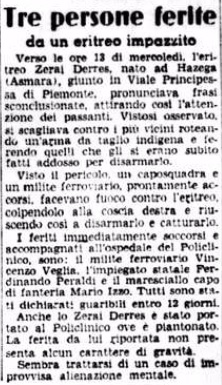
Il Messaggero (June 17, 1938)

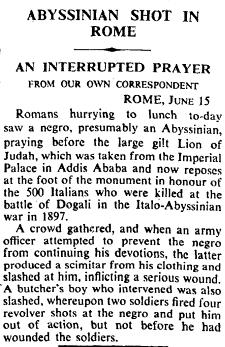
The Times (June 16, 1938)

On June 15, 1938, shortly before his planned return to his homeland, Zerai went to Princess of Piedmont Boulevard (now Luigi Einaudi Boulevard) during lunchtime and knelt at the foot of the Monument to the Lion of Judah, a symbol of the Ethiopian monarchy. The sculpture had been brought to Rome as spoils of war by the Italian fascist regime in 1935, placed under the monument to the fallen of Battle of Dogali, and inaugurated on May 8, 1937, at the eve of celebrations for the first anniversary of the Italian Empire proclamation.

As a small crowd gathered around Zerai, an Italian military officer tried to interrupt his devotions. Zerai pulled out a scimitar, struck the officer, and shouted imprecations against Italy and the Duce, while praising the Negus (Ethiopian monarch). During the confrontation, Zerai injured Italian Railways private Vincenzo Veglia, State employee Ferdinando Peraldi, and Infantry Chief Marshal Mario Izzo, who reported very slight wounds that healed within 12 days. According to other reports, some passersby, including a butcher's boy who hurled his bicycle at the Eritrean, were also injured.

Finally, two soldiers ended the attack with gunfire, shooting Zerai four times. Zerai was wounded in the thigh.

=== Reactions to the incident ===
For political reasons, Italian dictator Benito Mussolini was planning to repatriate the Abyssinian aristocrats not welcome in Rome to Ethiopia. (By July 1939 only one out of ninety of the detainees remained in Rome). That plan suddenly accelerated when on June 15, 1938, Mussolini was informed that Zerai, who worked as an interpreter for the Ras confined in Rome, had shouted imprecations against Italy and praised Haile Selassie in front of the monument to the fallen of Dogali. Informed that some people had been severely wounded in attempting to silence Zerai, Mussolini become furious and ordered the total repatriation of all Ethiopian noblemen.

However, the repatriation effort was slowed by the need to evaluate each case individually, as some Ethiopian dignitaries (including Ras Seyoum Mengesha, Ras Kebede Mengesha, Ras Mulugeta Yeggazu, and Degiac Asrate Mulughietà) were suspected of inspiring Zerai's protest, and it was preferable to exile them in Libya or the Dodecanese.

=== Internment and death ===
The episode was considered by the Italian authorities as an action of mental illness. Zerai was arrested, hospitalized at the Umberto I Policlynic, and then taken to Barcellona Pozzo di Gotto (province of Messina, Sicily) to the criminal asylum "Vittorio Madia".

During his internment, Zerai repeatedly tried to prove his mental sanity, but he failed to convince the Italian doctors. He also wrote letters to his family: on December 3, 1938, Zerai stated he was in good health and asked his brother Tesfazien Deres to reject the honorary title that Tesfazien had received from the Italian government. He wrote, "I'm fine. Always have been, and still am, in full possession of my mental faculties. I am in the Asylum only on account of government policy." According to the Italian historian Alessandro Triulzi, "The few letters he left behind bear witness to his lucidity."

After seven years at Barcellona Pozzo di Gotto asylum, Zerai died at the age of 30, on July 6, 1945.

=== Repatriation of remains ===
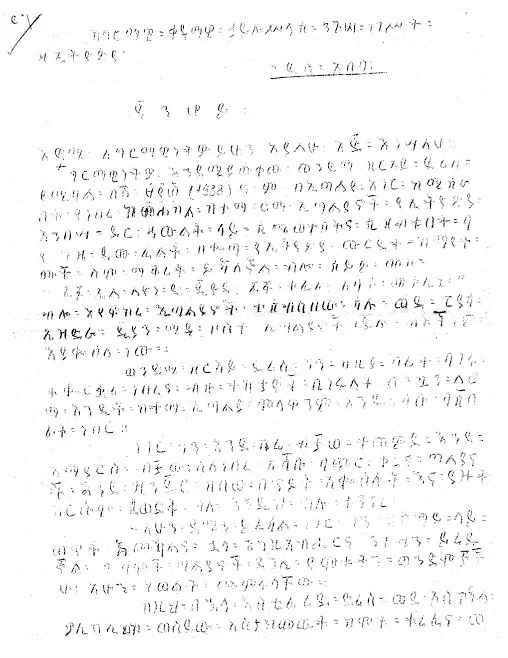
Tesfazion Deres wrote this letter to Emperor Selassie to get an airplane to bring home Zerai

Zerai's brother Tesfazien, founder of the Eritrea Independent Party, thinking that Zerai was still alive in an Italian prison in Italy, wrote a personal letter to the Ethiopian Emperor Haile Selassie asking to provide an airplane to Italy in order to bring his brother home. Tesfazien also approached the Minister of Foreign Affairs Ambaye Wolde Mariam to present the case to the Imperial Palace, initially without success.

Finally, Tesfazien reached Zerai in Sicily in July 1939, but he could do nothing to get his brother free from the asylum.

After Zerai's death in 1945, Tesfazien was able after a long struggle to repatriate his brother's remains to Eritrea. Zerai was buried in St. Mary's Church in Hazega, in front of which stands a monument depicting the patriot together with two lions.

== Lionization ==
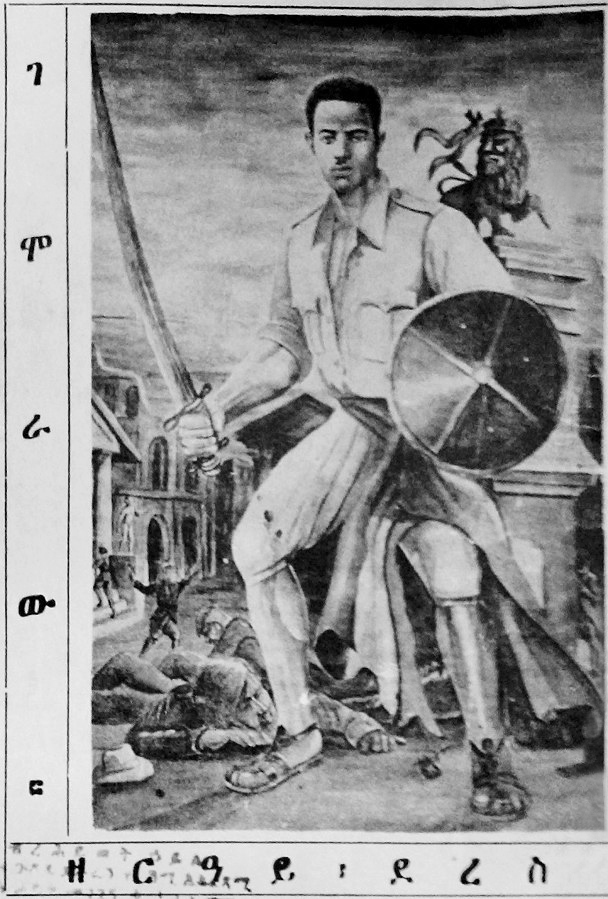
The story of Zerai Deres was mythicized in the postwar era, turning him into a national folk hero

At the end of World War II, the story of Zerai Deres was rewritten, dramatized, and sung in Ethiopia to celebrate his anti-colonial resistance, especially by the pan-Ethiopian who opposed the separation of Eritrea from Ethiopia. Zerai also became a hero of the anti-fascism movement.

Due to the prevalence of oral tradition, numerous and even contradictory details went to enhance the character, until he became a national folk hero in both Ethiopia and Eritrea, a status he retains to this day. Among the various reconstructions, there is one that sets the story during a celebratory event of the second anniversary of the announcement of the Italian empire (although the Italian empire's proclamation that made Ethiopia part of Italian East Africa was annually celebrated a month earlier, on May 9). The young Eritrean would have been chosen to take part in the military parade and carry a ceremonial sword that would have greeted the Italian king Vittorio Emanuele III, Adolf Hitler, and Benito Mussolini (although, as evidenced by the historical sources, none of the three were in Rome in those days, and in each case there was not any parade on June 15 in the capital city). Coming to the Piazza dei Cinquecento and recognizing the golden sculpture of the Lion of Judah to which his ancestors swore allegiance, Zerai would have been struck by a sudden amok or impetus of anti-colonial patriotism, deciding to stop at the steps, kneel, and pray towards the statue-symbol; or, with a sudden feeling of anger, he would hit with a sword the first Italian to cross his path.

According to other sources, Zerai killed at least five people, as well as wounded others, screaming words like "The Lion of Judah is avenged!" before being arrested or killed by the fascists on the spot in a hail of gunfire.

=== In popular culture ===
In the 1950s various historical theatrical plays were written in Ethiopia about the Italian invasion. Among these works, Ateneh Alemu wrote a play about Zerai Deres in 1956–1957.

In the 1970s, the story of the Eritrean patriot was rewritten by Ethiopian comedian Yilma Manaye in his work Zeraye Derese. This character was interpreted by Wegayehu Nigatu (1944–1990), a popular actor at the Ethiopian National Theater in Addis Ababa at the time. When the play was staged in Eritrea at Asmara's Opera, Wegayehu Nigatu's interpretation of Zerai was successfully received by the audience and his performance was so convincing that Tesfazien Deres wanted to host the actor for two weeks in order to have the opportunity to converse with him as with his dead brother.

Ethiopian poet laureate Tsegaye Gabre-Medhin wrote an historical play about Zerai in the 1980s.

In visual arts, the patriot was the subject of sculptures, including that of Tadesse Mamecha made in 1971.

The Zerai Deres Band has been a popular Eritrean jazz and folk music band since the 1970s.

== Remembrance ==
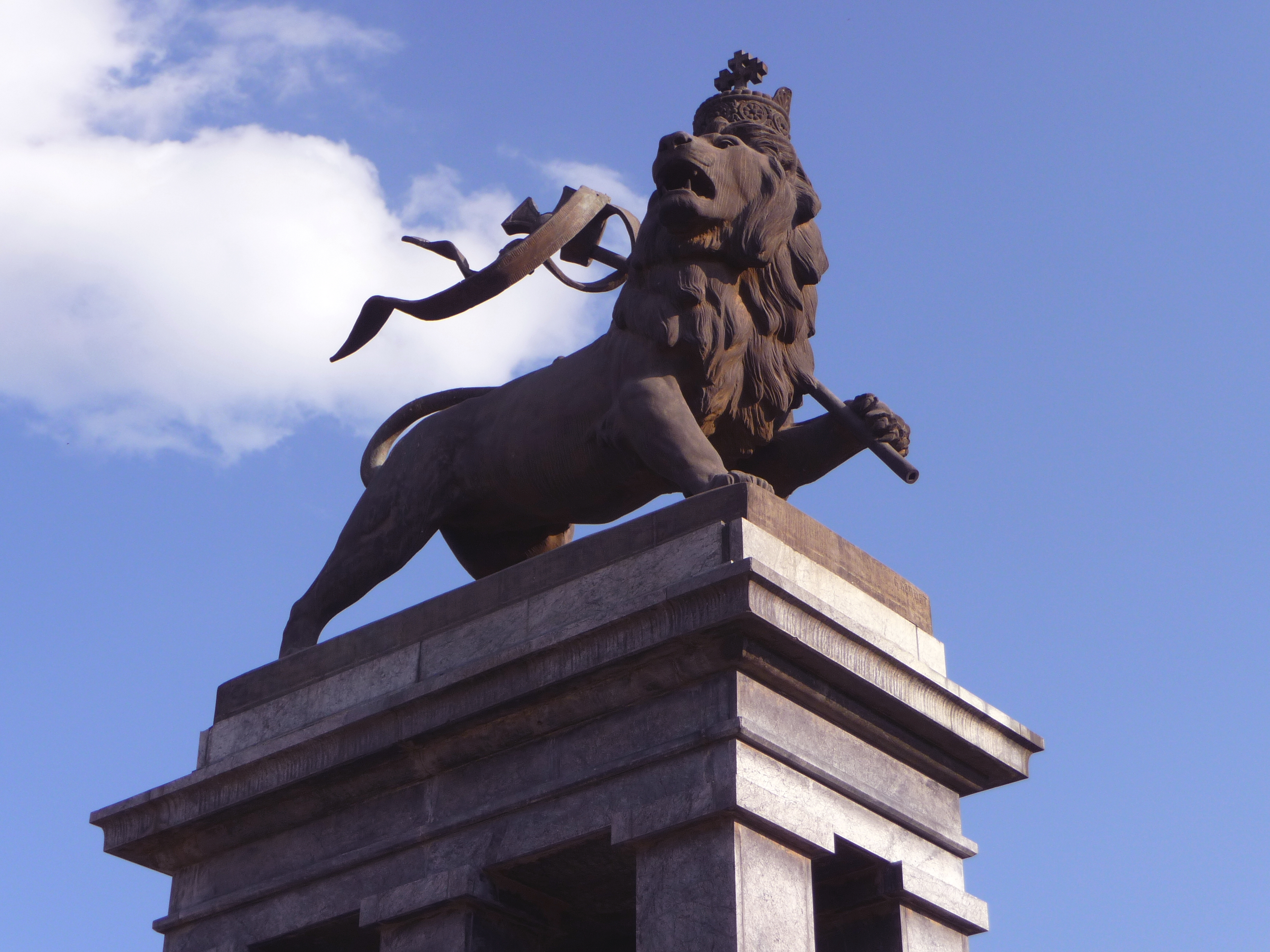
Monument to the Lion of Judah, back in Addis Ababa since the 1960s

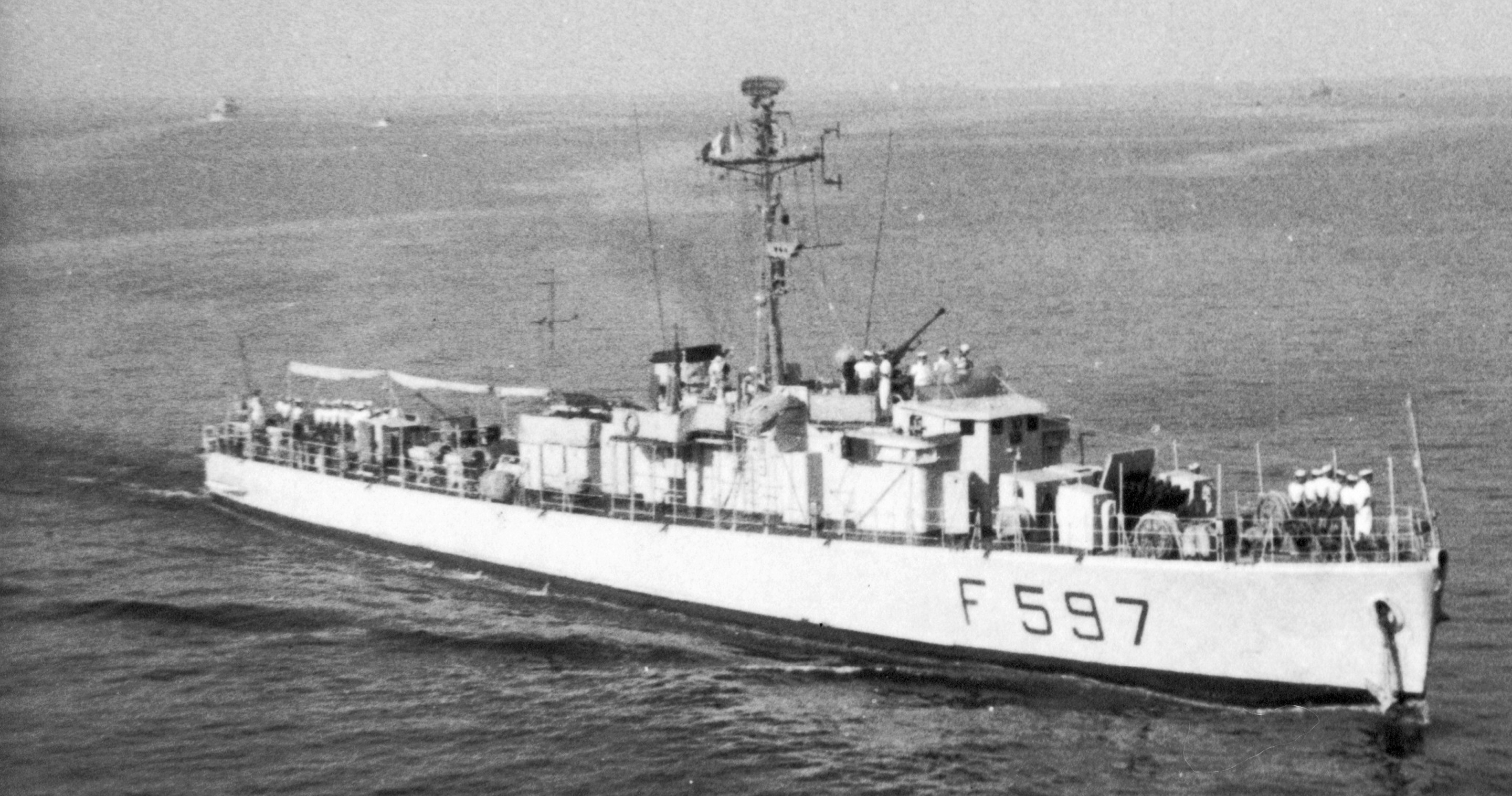
The Zerai Deres corvette of the Ethiopian Navy was transferred to Italy in 1959, then renamed Vedetta (F 597)

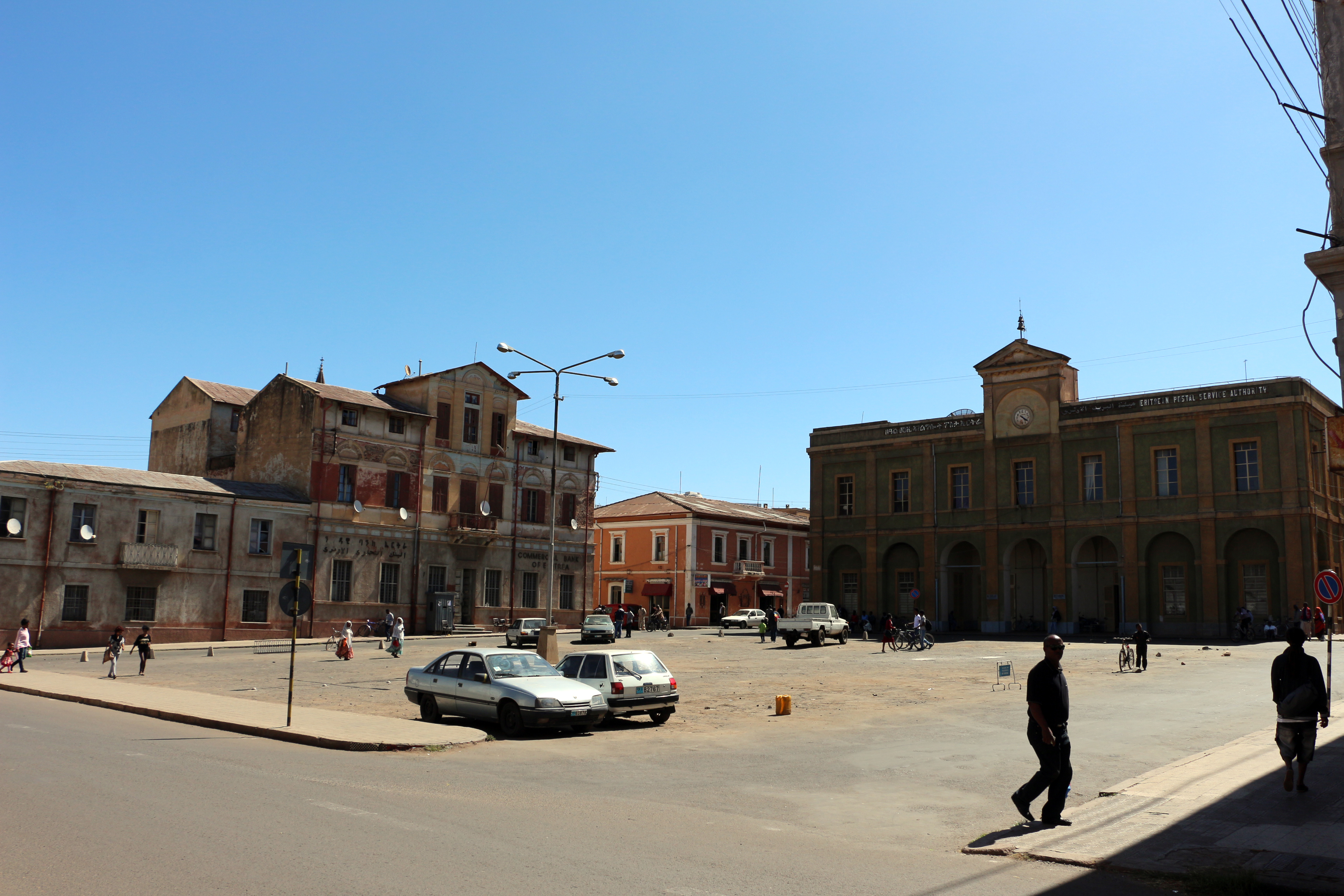
Zerai Deres Square in Asmara, Eritrea

In 1966, when the sculpture of the Lion of Judah was returned to Ethiopia, Emperor Haile Selassie recalled Zerai's patriotic gesture during the re-appointment ceremony held in Addis Ababa. After the 1974 Ethiopian Revolution, the Derg regime planned to remove the statue as a monarchic symbol. However, senior members of the war veterans association lobbied for the statue to remain as a symbol of Zerai Deres' sacrifice on behalf of anti-fascism. The Derg agreed to this request to save the statue, which stands in the Addis Ababa railway station square today.

The Ethiopian Navy's first military ship, a former U.S. Navy PC-1604-class submarine chaser donated by the United States Army in 1956, was christened Zerai Deres. A Soviet-made Petya-class frigate was also dedicated to the Eritrean patriot; it was launched in 1968 and sank in February 1991 near the island of Nocra.

The square where the Asmara's central post office and National Bank of Eritrea (former Palace of National Bank of Italy) are located was named Piazza Roma (Rome Square), but after independence it was dedicated to Zerai's memory. A number of roads, schools, hotels, and restaurants are also named after Zerai.

In 2016, on the occasion of the 75th anniversary of the liberation of Addis Ababa from Italian domination, a group of six stamps depicting national heroes, including Zerai, was issued by the Ethiopian Postal Service.

== See also ==
- Ethiopia
- Ethiopian prisoners of war during the Second Italo-Ethiopian War
- History of Eritrea
- Second Italo-Ethiopian War

== Bibliography ==
- Ateneh Alemu (1955–1956). Zerai Deress. Addis Abeba: Berhanena Selam Printing Enterprise.
- Hedat Berhane (1976). Zeray Deres, 1914–1945. IVth Year Essay. Asmara: Department of History, Haile Selassie University.
- Nicholas Lucchetti (2013). Dallo scandalo Livraghi ai fratelli Derres. Saggi sul colonialismo italiano (in Italian). Tricase: Youcanprint. ISBN 978-88-911-1701-4.
- Yelmā Mānāyé (1971). Gamorāw: Zarʻāy Daras (in Amharic).
