= Golden Boy (Manitoba) =

Statue on the Manitoba Legislative Building in Winnipeg

Coordinates: 49°53′04″N 97°08′48″W

The Golden Boy
- Eternal Youth and the Spirit of Enterprise
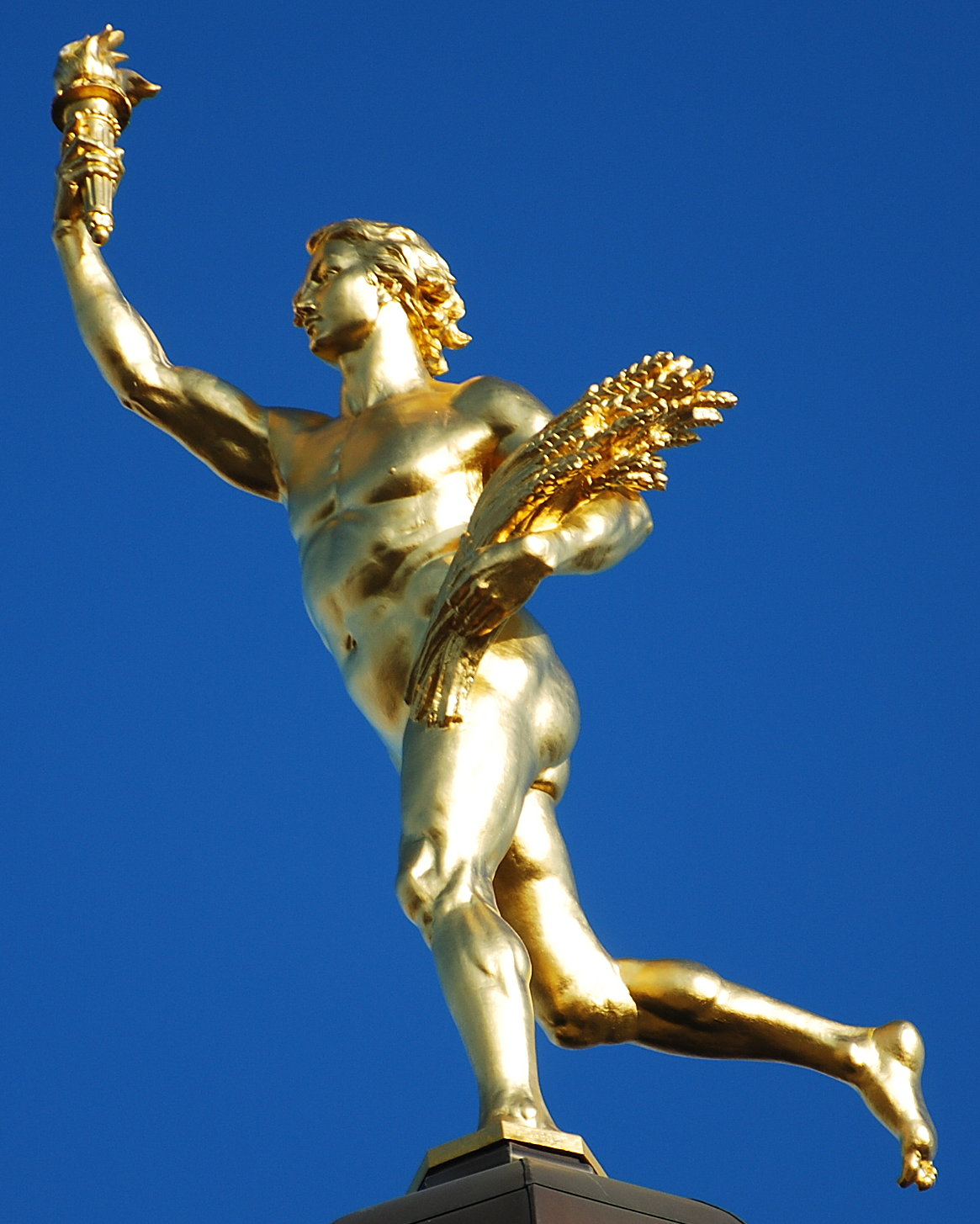
- Artist: Georges Gardet
- Year: 1918
- Medium: Gilded bronze statue
- Dimensions: 525 cm (207 in)
- Weight: 1,650 kg
- Location: Manitoba Legislative Building, Winnipeg, Manitoba, Canada

The Golden Boy (official name: Eternal Youth and the Spirit of Enterprise) is a northward-facing statue perched on the dome of the Manitoba Legislative Building in Winnipeg, Manitoba, Canada. Arguably the province's best-known symbol, the statue was modeled after the Roman god Mercury (Greek: Hermes) and is meant to represent the prosperity and entrepreneurial spirit of Manitoba.

The statue depicts a nude young man running forward carrying a torch in one hand and a bundle of wheat in the other.

Weighing 1,650 kilograms (3,640 lb), it stands 5.25 metres (17.2 ft) tall from the toe to the top of the torch, and 4.27 metres (14.0 ft) from head to toe. When first installed, the tip of his torch—at 77 metres (253 ft) above ground—was the tallest point in Winnipeg.

With the exception of several months in 2002 when the statue was lowered for restoration (including regilding), the Golden Boy has stood atop the Legislative Building since its opening.

== History ==
=== Background ===
The Golden Boy was conceived during the backdrop of World War I by British-born architect Frank Worthington Simon, who also designed the Manitoba Legislative Building that the figure would adorn.

The construction of the Canadian Pacific Railway began to open the West in the late-19th century, and as result, thousands of immigrants began settling in and near Winnipeg in 1881. By 1911, the population of Manitoba had increased over seven-fold, to 461,394. That year, as the province was rich in natural resources, and Winnipeg (its capital) was a hub for agriculture, grain trade, and other enterprises, the Government of Manitoba announced plans to construct a new legislature, which Manitoba politicians hoped to represent this emerging strength and vitality. Being judged as best reflecting this goal, Simon's designs intended to create a building of inspiration, and his 'crowning glory' would be the statue positioned at its highest point.

=== Creation ===
Sunset behind the golden boy

In the summer of 1915, Simon commissioned Parisian sculptor Georges Gardet to create the statue. Over the next 18 months or so, the men exchanged transatlantic letters and drawings regularly. These documents are now preserved at the Archives of Manitoba in Winnipeg.

Simon prepared the shaft for the statue to be built in two parts: the upper part, extending from the statue to the centre of the ball where it would fit into the coupling, was to be built in France. The lower part of the shaft would be built in Winnipeg, upon delivery of the statue. As both metals and lathes were needed for the war effort, obtaining even basic materials for the statue was difficult; in a memo to the Manitoba Minister of Public Works in December 1917, Simon explained that it "was impossible to obtain [the shaft] either in England or in France owing to war conditions". Eventually the upper shaft was constructed in Chicago and shipped to France. Simon had also wished for the statue to be cast from one piece of material without any joints or seams. Given the metal shortage in France, however, several smaller pieces were used.

Purchased by the Government of Manitoba from France, the statue was completed by Gardet in 1918, cast in bronze by the Barbedienne Foundry. The factory was bombed but the statue was not damaged.

=== Delivery ===
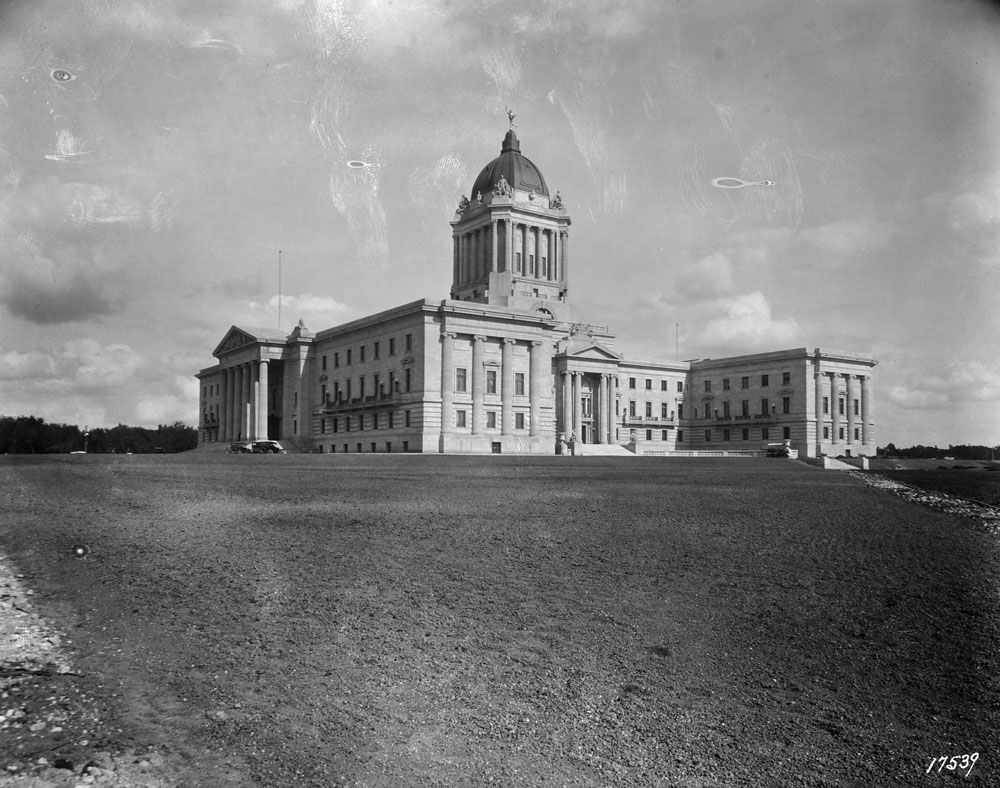
The Manitoba Legislative Building

The statue was placed in the hold of a freight ship for transport to Canada. The ship was then commandeered for war service and directed to transport allied troops and supplies. The statue remained in the ship for the remainder of the War, making two trips across the Mediterranean and five transatlantic crossings.

The statue arrived in Halifax, Nova Scotia, and was shipped by train to Winnipeg, where it was placed atop the Manitoba Legislative Building on 21 November 1919, in time for the official opening of the Legislative Building in 1920.

Although made of bronze, the statue—originally and officially titled 'Eternal Youth and the Spirit of Enterprise'—was nicknamed 'Golden Boy' from the onset, as the new bronze figure shined and reflected the sun, making the figure appear to be made of gold.

The final cost of the Golden Boy—including expenses related to designing, creating, casting, transporting, and lifting the statue to the top of the Legislature dome—totalled CA$13,240.73.

=== Renovation and restoration ===
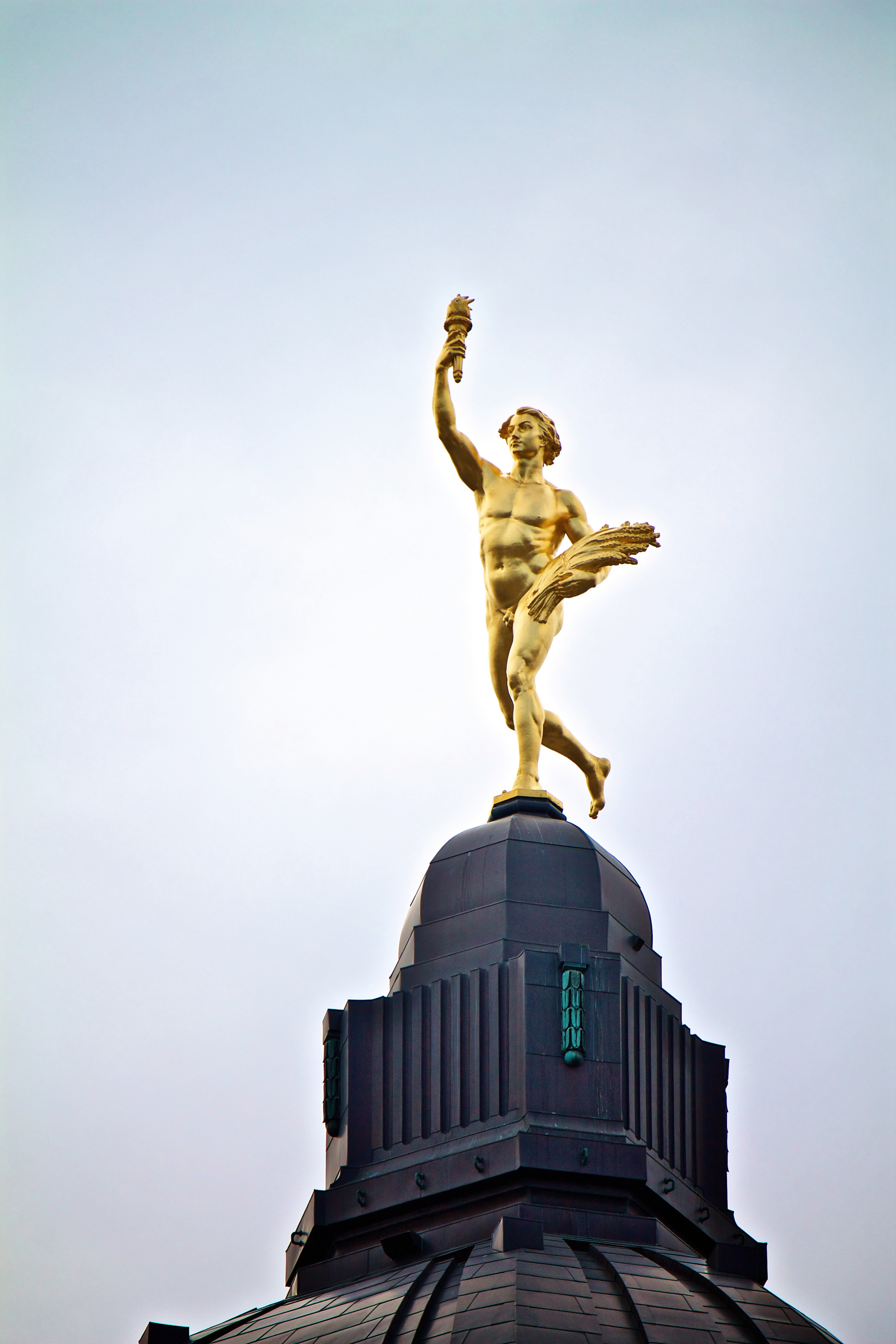
The Golden Boy viewed from the front.

In the 1940s, the bronze statue was painted gold. This was followed in 1951 by its first gilding with 50,000 square inches of 23.5-carat gold leaf, measuring 3.25 square inches per sheet. In 1966, the Government of Manitoba had an electric lamp installed atop the torch of the statue, which was first lit on 31 December 1966 to mark Canada's centennial celebrations in 1967.

In 2002, the statue required repair because rust was accumulating on the inside of its hollow core and its iron supports were eroding away; Alpha Masonry, the general contractor for the restoration project, lowered the statue to the ground for a complete overhaul and regilding. On 9 February 2002, the Golden Boy returned to the ground in a custom-made aluminum cage after almost 83 years in place.

In August 2002, the statue was regilded with a micro-thin coat of 23.75-karat gold leaf in a climate-controlled enclosure in full view of the public. During the restoration, the statue was also placed on public display at the Manitoba Museum and at the Forks National Historic Site. Prepared by Bristol Aerospace with a custom-manufactured paint from Germany, the statue was regilded using 4,000 sheets of extra-heavy gold leaf. A new steel support post was installed by ISIS Canada, accompanied by a structural health monitoring system—monitors and gauges for measuring vibrations and strain as well as for wind stress and temperature effect on the statue and support structure.

The Golden Boy was returned to the Legislative Building and re-installed on the dome on 5 September 2002. It was rededicated by Queen Elizabeth II, Queen of Canada, during her 2002 Golden Jubilee tour of Canada the following month. The restoration cost a total of CA$1.1 million. The regilding cost $34,000, with the gold-leaf costing $5,600.

The new gilding is expected to last about 25 to 30 years. Since its restoration, the Golden Boy's torch is no longer lit because its electrical cord had been one of the causes for the rust found in 2002. Instead, it is lit at night by floodlights.

== Symbolism ==
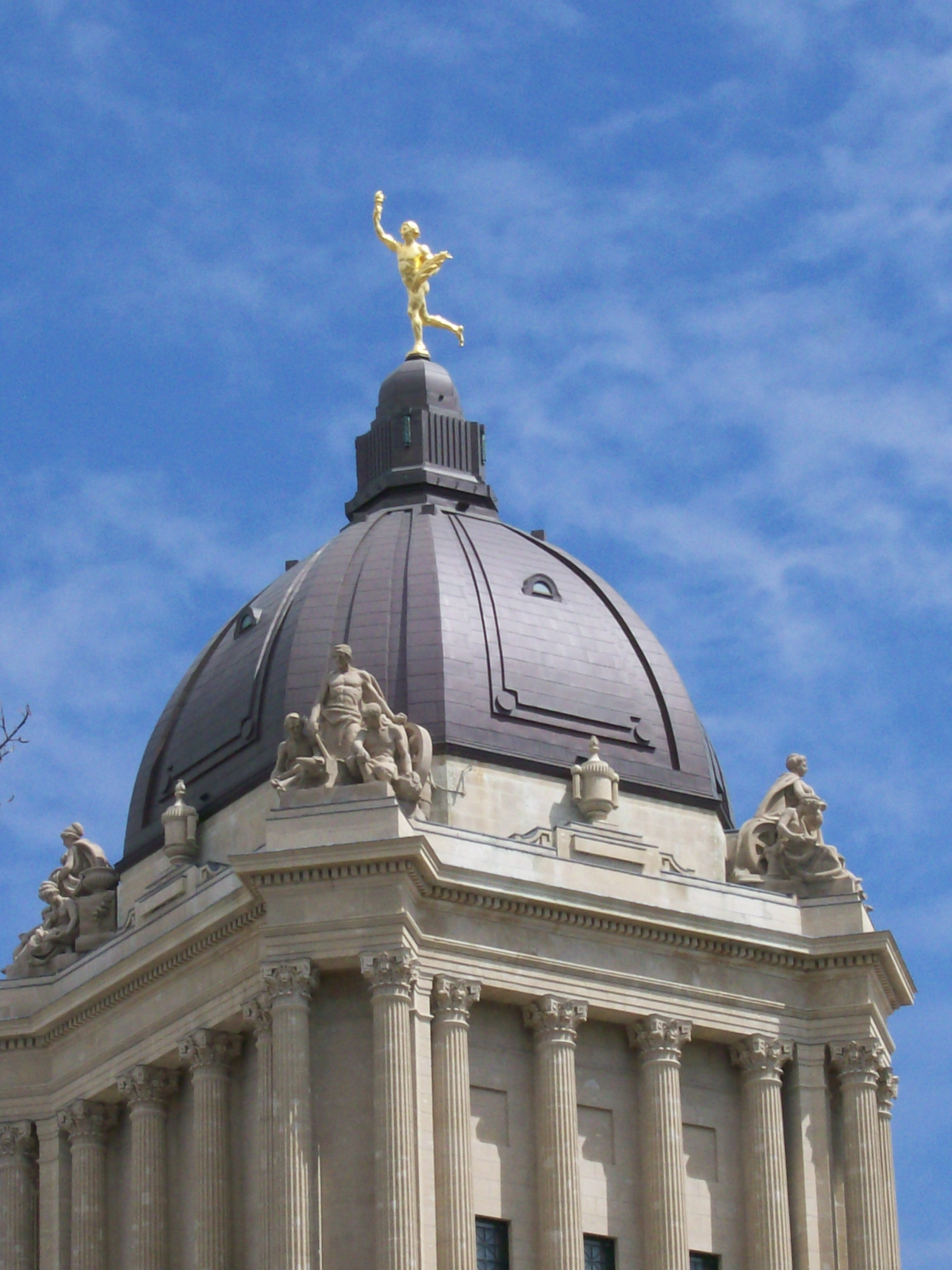
The Golden Boy atop the Manitoba Legislature

The Golden Boy was modelled on Giovanni da Bologna's 16th-century sculpture of the Roman messenger god of trade, profit and commerce, Mercury. The sheaf of wheat in the statue' left arm represents the fruits of labour, while the torch in its right hand represents a call to youth to join his eternal pursuit of a more prosperous future. The statue faces in a north direction, pointing towards the Manitoba region to symbolize its importance as a provider of important natural resources and economic opportunity.

"Manitoba Golden Boy" is a traditional fiddle tune in the statue's honour. The chorus includes the following:

He’s the symbol of success
At the gateway to the west
And he’s our legendary pride and joy.
