= Rose Fyleman =

English writer and poet

Rose Amy Fyleman
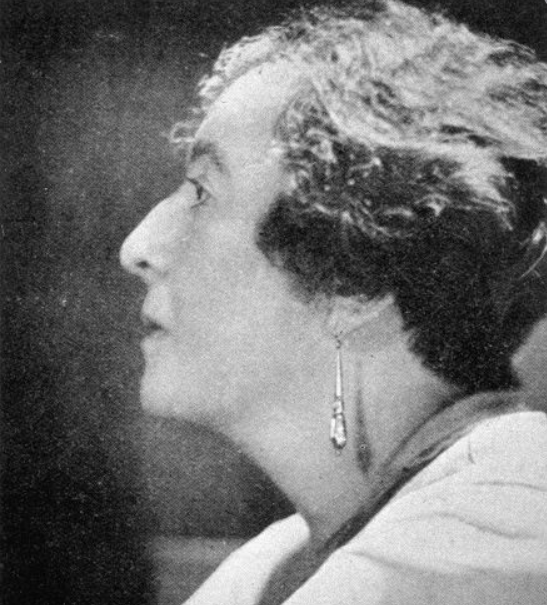
- Rose Fyleman photographed by Howard Coster, 1926
- Born: Rose Amy Feilmann; 6 March 1877; Nottingham, England
- Died: 1 August 1957 (aged 80); St Albans, Hertfordshire, England

Rose Amy Fyleman (née Feilmann, 6 March 1877 – 1 August 1957) was an English writer and poet, noted for her works on fairies for children. Her 1917 poem "There are fairies at the bottom of our garden" was set to music by English composer Liza Lehmann.

== Life and works ==
Rose Fyleman was born in Nottingham on 6 March 1877, the third child of John Feilmann and his wife, Emilie, née Loewenstein, who was of Russian extraction. Her father was in the lace trade, and his Jewish family originated in 1860 from Jever in the Grand Duchy of Oldenburg, currently Lower Saxony, Germany.

As a young girl, Fyleman was educated at a private school, and at the age of nine first saw one of her compositions published in a local paper. Although she entered University College, Nottingham, she failed in the intermediate and was thus unable to pursue her ambition of becoming a schoolteacher. Despite this, Fyleman had a good singing voice, and therefore decided to study music. She studied singing in Paris, Berlin and finally at the Royal College of Music in London, where she received her diploma as associate of the Royal College of Music. She returned to Nottingham shortly afterward, where she taught singing and helped in her sister's school. With other members of her family, she anglicised the spelling of her name at the outbreak of the First World War in 1914.

When she was forty, Fyleman sent her verses to Punch magazine and her first publication "There are Fairies at the Bottom of Our Garden" appeared in May 1917. The immense response from publishers prompted Fyleman to submit several other fairy poems. Her verses enjoyed tremendous success among readers and her first collection Fairies and Chimneys (1918) was reprinted more than twenty times over the next decade. During the 1920s and early 1930s Rose Fyleman published multiple verse collections, wrote drama for children, and for two years, edited the children's magazine Merry-Go-Round. She asked fellow Punch contributor, A. A. Milne, for some verses for her children's magazine; these verses would be collected in his When We Were Very Young (1924). A Princess Comes to Our Town (1927), in which a fairy princess visits the sights of contemporary Nottingham with the author, was republished by Five Leaves in 2023, with an introduction by Nottingham author, Rowena Edlin-White.

Rose Fyleman was one of the most successful children's writers of her generation and she saw much of her earlier poetry become proverbial. Fyleman was also a skilled linguist who translated books from German, French and Italian, including the Bibi children's stories of Danish writer Karin Michaëlis. Her carol "Lift your hidden faces", set to a French carol tune, was included in the Anglican hymnal Songs of Praise (1925), The Oxford Book of Carols (1928) as well as in the Hutterites' Songs of Light (1977).

She died at a nursing home in St Albans, Hertfordshire, on 1 August 1957.

== "Winnipeg at Christmas" ==
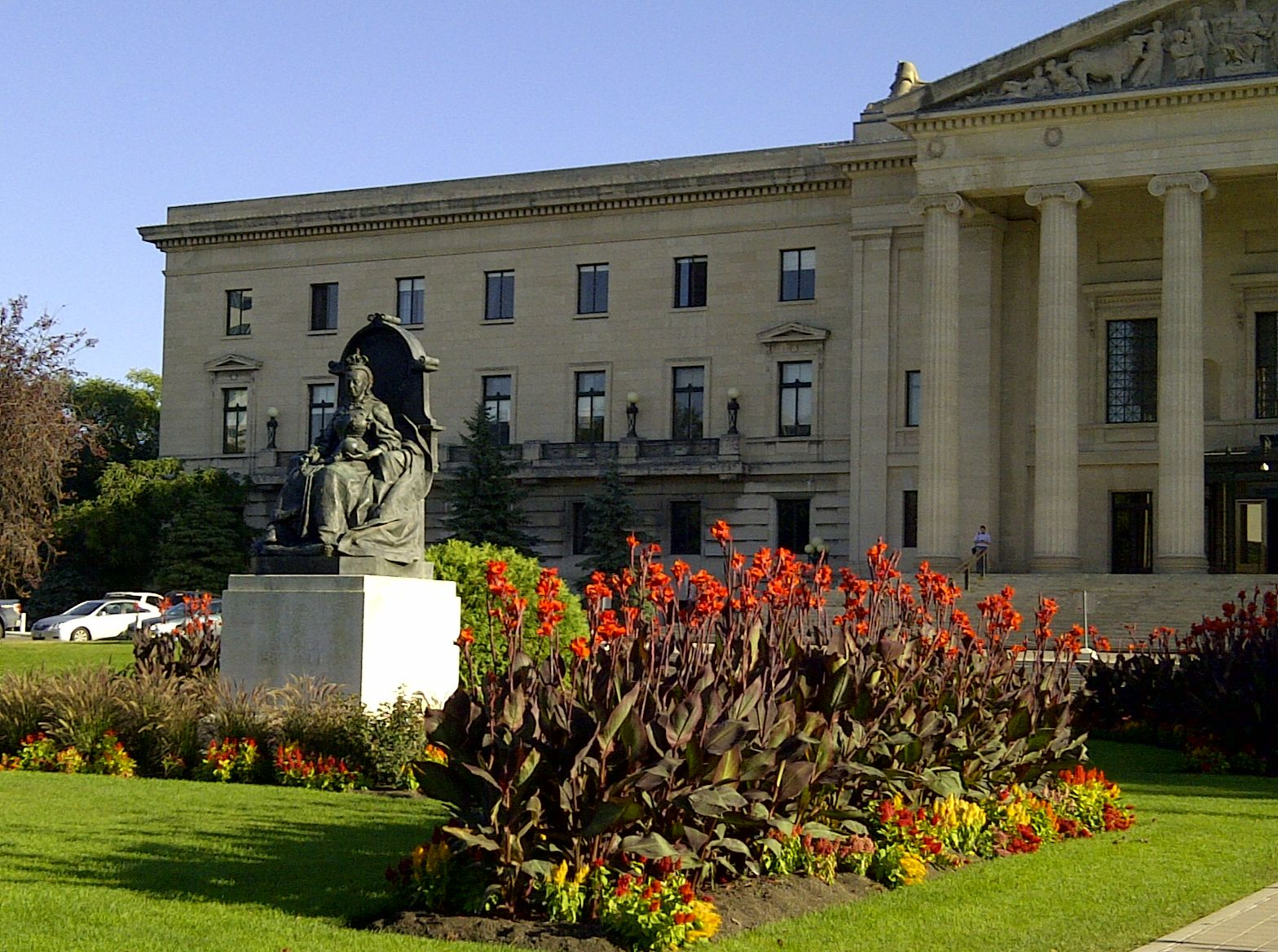
Queen Victoria statue and the Manitoba Legislative Building, taken in 2013

In December 1929, Rose Fyleman was invited to Winnipeg in Manitoba, Canada, as the guest speaker at a couple of women's clubs. While staying at the Fort Garry Hotel, Fyleman and the president of one of the clubs took a stroll to the Manitoba Parliament Building, so that she could view the statue of Queen Victoria. Fyleman was inspired to write a poem entitled "Winnipeg at Christmas".

The poem appeared in print on New Year's Day, 1930 in Punch. This poem is familiar to many inhabitants of Winnipeg, who were first exposed to it in school, and it is often cited during the Christmas season. Fred Penner, a children's entertainer from Winnipeg, included it on his 1990 recording for Christmas, entitled The Season. In 2018 The Winnipeg Singers, a choir from Winnipeg, commissioned Michael A. McKay to write a choral setting of the poem and premiered it in their 2018 Christmas concert, "In Winnipeg It's Christmas".

== Published works ==
(from the Poetry Foundation)

=== Juvenile ===
- The Rainbow Cat and Other Stories, illustrations by Thelma Cudlipp Grosvenor, Methuen (London, England), 1922, Doran (New York, NY), 1923.
- Forty Good-Night Tales, illustrations by Thelma Cudlipp Grosvenor, Methuen (London, England), 1923, Doran (New York, NY), 1924.
- The Adventure Club, illustrations by A. H. Watson, Methuen (London, England), 1925, Doran (New York, NY), 1926.
- Letty: A Study of a Child, illustrations by Lisl Hummel, Methuen (London, England), 1926, Doran (New York, NY), 1927.
- Forty Good-Morning Tales, Methuen (London, England), 1926, Doran (New York, NY), 1929.
- Twenty Tea-Time Tales, Methuen (London, England), 1929, published as Tea Time Tales, Doubleday (New York, NY), 1930.
- The Dolls' House, illustrations by Margaret Tempest, Methuen (London, England), 1930, Doubleday (New York, NY), 1931.
- The Katy Kruse Play Book, illustrations by Katy Kruse, McKay (Philadelphia, PA), 1930.
- The Strange Adventures of Captain Marwhopple, illustrations by Gertrude Lindsay, Methuen (London, England), 1931, Doubleday (New York, NY), 1932.
- The Easter Hare, and Other Stories, illustrations by Decie Merwin, Methuen (London, England), 1932.
- Jeremy Quince, Lord Mayor of London, illustrations by Cecil Leslie, Cape (London, England), 1933.
- The Princess Dances, illustrations by Cecil Leslie, Dent (London, England), 1933.
- Timothy's Conjuror, Methuen (London, England), 1942.
- The Timothy Boy Trust, illustrations by Marjorie Wratten, Methuen (London, England), 1944.
- Hob and Bob: A Tale of Two Goblins, illustrations by Charles Stewart, Hollis & Carter (London, England), 1944.
- Adventures with Benghazi, illustrations by Peggy Fortnum, Eyre & Spottiswoode (London, England), 1946.
- The Smith Family at the Seaside, Arnold (Leeds, England), 1947.
- The Smith Family in the Country, Arnold (Leeds, England), 1947.
- The Smith Family in Town, Arnold (Leeds, England), 1947.
- Nursery Stories, Evans (London, England), 1949.
- Lucy the Lamb, Eyre & Spottiswoode (London, England), 1951.
- Neddy the Donkey, Eyre & Spottiswoode (London, England), 1951.
- The Sparrow and the Goat, Eyre & Spottiswoode (London, England), 1951.
- The Starling and the Fox, Eyre & Spottiswoode (London, England), 1951.
- White Flower, illustrations by M. E. Stewart, Arnold (Leeds, England), 1953.

=== Poetry; juvenile ===
- The Sunny Book, illustrations by Millicent Sowerby, Oxford University Press (London, England), 1918.
- Fairies and Chimneys, illustrations by Hilda T. Miller, Methuen (London, England), 1918, Doran (New York, NY), 1920.
- The Fairy Green, Methuen (London, England), 1919, Doran (New York, NY), 1923.
- The Fairy Flute, Methuen (London, England), 1921, Doran (New York, NY), 1923.
- A Small Cruse, illustrations by Katy Kruse, Methuen (London, England), 1923.
- The Rose Fyleman Fairy Book, illustrations by Hilda T. Miller, Doran (New York, NY), 1923.
- Fairies and Friends, Methuen (London, England), 1925, Doran (New York, NY), 1926.
- The Rose Fyleman Calendar, illustrations by Lisl Hummel, Methuen (London, England), 1927.
- (With others) Joy Street Poems, Blackwell (Oxford, England), 1927.
- A Princess Comes to Our Town, illustrations by Gertrude Lindsay, Methuen (London, England), 1927, Doubleday (New York, NY), 1928.
- (Editor) Round the Mulberry Bush: Being a Book of Stories and Verses for Children, Dodd, Mead (New York, NY), 1928.
- Old-Fashioned Girls, and Other Poems, illustrations by Ethel Everett, Methuen (London, England), 1928.
- A Garland of Rose's: Collected Poems of Rose Fyleman, illustrations by René Bull, Methuen (London, England), 1928.
- Gay Go Up, illustrations by Decie Merwin, Methuen (London, England), 1929, Doubleday (New York, NY), 1930.
- Fifty-One New Nursery Rhymes, illustrations by Dorothy Burroughes, Methuen (London, England), 1931, Doubleday (New York, NY), 1932.
- (With Thomas F. Dunhill) The Blue Rhyme Book (text by Fyleman; music by Dunhill), Boosey-Methuen (London, England), 1933.
- (Editor) Sugar and Spice: A Collection of Nursery Rhymes, New and Old, illustrations by Janet Laura Scott, Whitman (Racine, WI), 1935.
- (Editor) Here We Come A'Piping, illustrations by Irene Mountfort, four volumes, Blackwell (Oxford, England), 1936–37, one-volume edition, Stokes (New York, NY), 1937.
- (Editor) A'Piping Again, illustrations by Irene Mountfort, Blackwell (Oxford, England), 1936, Stokes (New York, NY), 1938.
- (Editor) Bells Ringing: An Anthology of Verse for Young Children, illustrations by Irene Mountfort, Blackwell (Oxford, England), 1938, Stokes (New York, NY), 1939.
- (Editor) Pipe and Drum: An Anthology of Verse for Young Children, illustrations by Irene Mountfort, Blackwell (Oxford, England), 1939, Stokes (New York, NY), 1940.
- Runabout Rhymes, illustrations by Margaret Tempest, Methuen (London, England), 1941.
- Number Rhymes, Arnold (Leeds, England), 1946.
- Rhyme Book for Adam, Methuen (London, England), 1949.
- (Editor) Over the Tree Tops: Nursery Rhymes from Many Lands, Blackwell (Oxford, England), 1949.
- A Fairy Went A-Marketing, illustrations by Jamichael Henterly, Dutton (New York, NY), 1986.

=== Plays; juvenile ===
- Eight Little Plays for Children (includes Darby and Joan, The Fairy Riddle, Noughts and Crosses, The Weather Clerk, The Fairy and the Doll, Cabbages and Kings, In Arcady, and Father Christmas), Methuen (London, England), 1924, Doran (New York, NY), 1925.
- Seven Little Plays for Children (includes The Princess and the Pirate, The Mermaid, Peter Coffin, The Arm-Chair, Mother Goose's Party, The Coming of Father Christmas, and The Butcher, the Baker, the Candlestick Maker), Methuen (London, England), 1928.
- Nine New Plays for Children (includes The Whisker, The Moon, Cinderella "At Home," The Sampler, Three Naughty Imps, The Test, Sleeping Beauty, Father Christmas Comes to Supper, and Surprise, the Imp), illustrations by Eleanor L. Halsey, Nelson (New York, NY), 1934.
- Six Longer Plays for Children (includes Snow-White, Porridge, Pork-Pie Night, The Beat, The Gus-Plug, and The Angry Brownies), illustrations by Eleanor L. Halsey, Nelson (London, England), 1936.
- The Magic Pencil, and Other Plays from My Tales (includes The Carpet of Truth, Captain Marwhopple, The Rhyming Prince, The Magic Pencil, The Chestnut Man, The Three Princesses, Troodle, and A Legend of St. Nicholas), Methuen (London, England), 1938.
- The Spanish Cloak, Methuen (London, England), 1939.
- (Adaptor; with Will Grant) Red-Riding Hood, music by Grant, Oxford University Press (Oxford, England), 1949.

=== Translations; juvenile ===
- Karin Michaëlis, Bibi, illustrations by Hedvig Collin, Allen & Unwin (London, England), 1933.
- Karin Michaëlis, Bibi Goes Travelling, illustrations by Hedvig Collin, Allen & Unwin (London, England), 1934.
- Widdy-Widdy-Wurkey: Nursery Rhymes from Many Lands, illustrations by Valerie Carrick, Blackwell (Oxford, England), 1934, published as Picture Rhymes from Foreign Lands, Stokes (New York, NY), 1935, published as Nursery Rhymes from Many Lands, Dover (New York, NY), 1971.
- Karin Michaëlis, Green Island, illustrations by Hedvig Collin, Allen & Unwin (London, England), 1936.
- Lida, Père Castor's Wild Animal Books, eight volumes, illustrations by Rojan, Allen & Unwin, 1937–42.
- Jan Karafiat, Fireflies, illustrations by Emil Weiss, Allen & Unwin (London, England), 1942.
- Alfred Flueckiger, Tuck: The Story of a Snow Hare, illustrations by Grace Huxtable, Lane (London, England), 1949.
- Marie-Louise Ventteclaye, Simone and the Lilywhites, Museum Press (London, England), 1949.
- Lillian Miozzi, The Adventures of Tommy, the Cat Who Went to Sea, illustrations by Charlotte Hough, Lane (London, England), 1950.
- Lily Martini, Peter and His Friend Toby, illustrations by Wolfgang Felten, Lane (London, England), 1955.

=== Other ===
- A Little Christmas Book, illustrations by Lisl Hummel, Methuen (London, England), 1926, Doran (New York, NY), 1927.
- The Katy Kruse Dolly Book, illustrations by Katy Kruse, Doran (New York, NY), 1927.
- (Translator) Songs, Curwen (London, England), 1927.
- The Second Katy Kruse Dolly Book, Harrap (London, England), 1930.
- Hey! Ding-a-Ding, University of London Press (London, England), 1931.
- The Rose Fyleman Birthday Book, illustrations by Muriel Dawson and Margaret Tarrant, Medici Society (London, England), 1932.
- (With Thomas F. Dunhill) Happy Families (opera; produced in 1933), music by Dunhill, Methuen (London, England), 1933.
- Bears, illustrations by Stuart Tresilian, Nelson (New York, NY), 1935.
- Monkeys, Nelson (New York, NY), 1936.
- (With E. M. D. Wilson) Billy Monkey: A True Tale of a Capuchin, illustrations by Cecil Leslie, Nelson (London, England), 1936, Nelson (New York, NY), 1937.
- A Book of Saints: Joan of Arc to St. Nicholas, illustrations by Gertrude Mittelman, Methuen (London, England), 1939.
- Folk-Tales from Many Lands, Methuen (London, England), 1939.
- (Translator) After All (play), Methuen (London, England), 1939.
- (Editor) Let's Play, Grout (London, England), 1943.
- (Editor) Punch and Judy, illustrations by Paul Henning, Methuen (London, England), 1944.
- Daphne and Dick: An Uncle from Canada, illustrations by Jeannetta Vise, Macdonald (London, England), 1952.
- Daphne and Dick: Round and About, illustrations by Jeannetta Vise, Macdonald (London, England), 1952.
- Founding editor, The Merry-Go-Round, 1923–24.
- Contributor to periodicals, including Horn Book and Punch.

== See also ==
- Clerk of the Weather
