= Clerk of the Weather =

Imaginary person who controls the weather

The Clerk of the Weather or the Weather Clerk is "an imaginary functionary facetiously supposed to direct the weather."

The Clerk of the Weather appears in children's stories by Rose Fyleman ("The Weather Clerk"), Robert Swindells (The Weather-Clerk), and others.

He also appears in facetious turns of phrase such as "another fine day was supplied by the clerk of the weather".

In Nathaniel Hawthorne's short story "A Visit to the Clerk of the Weather" (1836), he is imagined as a 6,000-year-old man living on another planet. Within his dwelling, he has a stock of thunderbolts, rainbows, hailstones, sacks of wind, and a "portable tempest, firmly secured with iron bands". His companions include Jack Frost and Spring.

In Herman Melville's poem "Pebbles" one finds "Though the Clerk of the Weather insist, / And lay down the weather-law, / Pintado and gannet they wist / That the winds blow whither they list / In tempest or flaw".

In Samuel Clemens' speech at the New England Society of New York in 1876, he attributed New England weather to "raw apprentices in the Weather Clerk's factory, who experiment and learn how in New England, for board and clothes, and then are promoted to make weather for countries that require a good article, and will take their custom elsewhere if they don't get it."

U. A. Fanthorpe, in her poem "Special", refers to a class of children looking after a dog as "Clerks of the Weather".
