= Lisl Hummel =

Austrian-born silhouette artist

Lisl Hummel Borsook
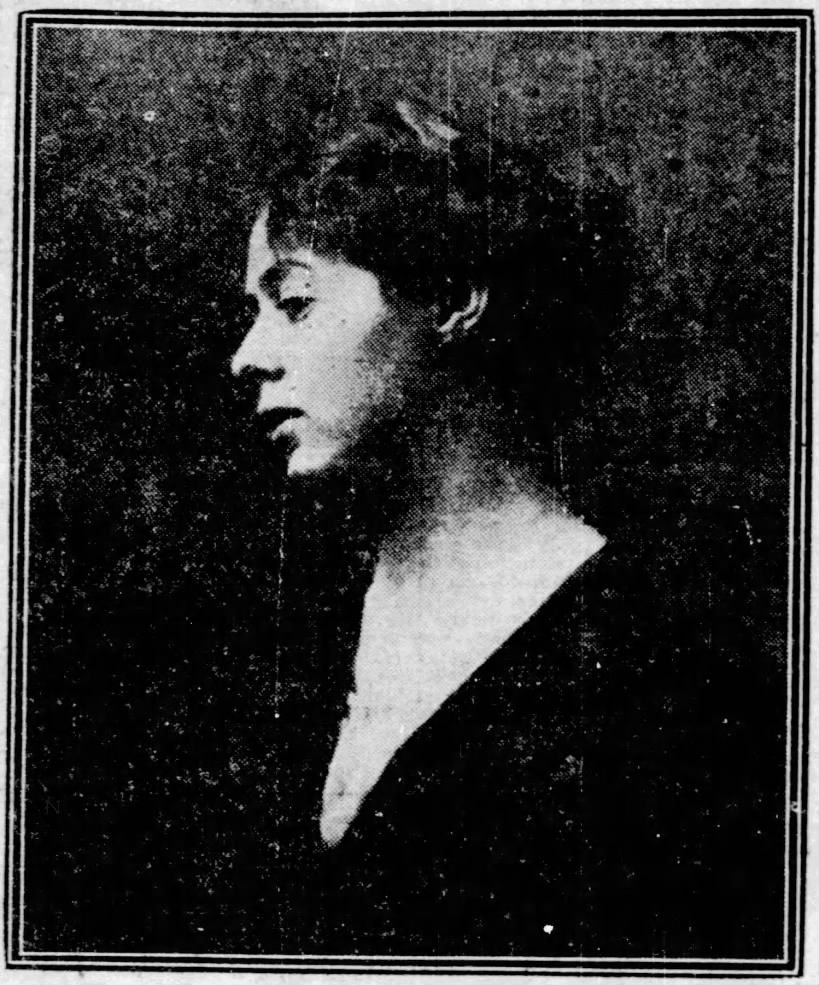
- Lisl Hummel circa 1925, published in The Toronto Star
- Born: Lisl Hummel; May 19, 1892; Vienna, Austria
- Died: May 30, 1990 (aged 98); Santa Barbara, California
- Citizenship: United States
- Spouse: Henry Borsook
- Children: Eve Borsook

Lisl Hummel Borsook (19 May 1892 – 30 May 1990) was an Austrian-born artist that spent the majority of her life in the United States. She was known for her silhouette papercuts, which were mainly created as illustrations for children's books and fairy tales.

== Early life and education ==
Hummel was born on 19 May 1892 in Vienna, Austria to parents Rosa Schweitzer and Sigmund Hummel. Her sisters were Martha (later, Martha Ullmen) and Emmy (later, Emmy Simon). Educated in Vienna, Hummel graduated at 18-years-old from the Lyceum there before going to study art in Munich. Her professor was the first to suggest she begin papercutting in her art, due to the clear outlines in her drawings.

== Career and life ==
Hummel worked mainly with silhouette papercuts, which she used to illustrate children's books and fairy tales. For her work, she used a pencil, scissors, and black paper that was white on the back. She would sketch her drawing on the white side of the paper before cutting, and her finished pieces tended to be around 3 to 5 inches across. Many of her papercuts included children, fairies, or animals.

One of Hummel's first exhibits was held in 1911 in Switzerland, where she lived and worked for a period of time. She lived in Zurich in the 1920s. Around this time, her work was covered by a prominent art magazine in Switzerland. Hummel also became recognized as an artist in England. She spent three months in London working on illustrations for the book The Heart of London, written by H. V. Morton.

In 1924, Hummel and her sister spent around a year in Toronto, Canada. Her work began to be recognized in North America, and her artwork was used for magazine covers and by various book publishers. She mainly illustrated fairy tales, but also made art for insurance company booklets and wrote poetry. Her artwork was loaned by her sister to the Hart House at the University of Toronto, where it was exhibited in 1925.

Hummel moved to Toronto, Canada in the fall of 1928, first living with her sister. During this time, she was engaged to Henry Borsook, a playwright and medical researcher at the University of Toronto. While planning for their wedding, she simultaneously worked on illustrations for a book soon-to-be-published in the United States, titled Poems about Peter, written by Lysbeth Boyse Borie.

Hummel and Borsook married. They had a daughter, Eve, in 1929. The year after, they moved to Pasadena, California, when Henry obtained a professorship at the California Institute of Technology. By 1930, Hummel's artwork had been printed in various magazines and newspapers, including Country Life, London Mercury, London Evening Standard, and Studio Magazine. She officially gained United States citizenship in 1937.

In the 1930, 1940, and 1950 U.S. censuses, Hummel was listed as either being a homemaker or not having an occupation. In 1945, her work was exhibited in the Member's Room at the Pasadena Art Institute. Later in her life, The Berkley Gazette stated she was known as an artist before her marriage.

Hummel died on 30 May 1990 in Santa Barbara, California.

== Gallery ==
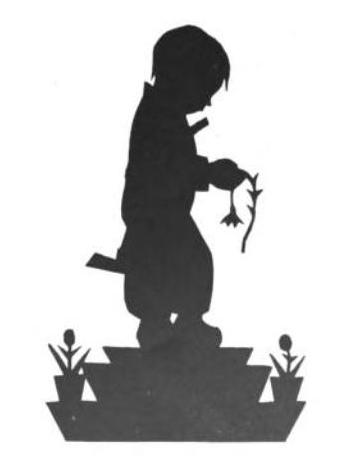
"Weeds and Flowers" papercut (c. 1926)

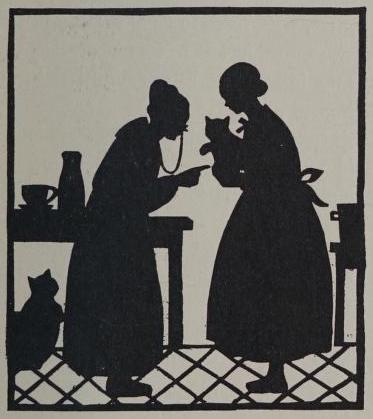
Papercut from Sally in Her Fur Coat (1929)

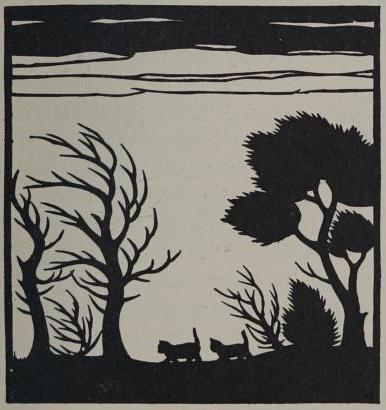
Papercut from Sally in Her Fur Coat (1929)

== Works ==
- Little Christmas Book (1927), written by Rose Fyleman
- Good-natured Bear (1927), written by Richard Henry Horne
- The Little Pagan Faun and Other Fancies (c. 1928), written by Patrick Chalmers
- Sally in Her Fur Coat (1929), written by Eliza Orne White
- The Green Door (1931), written by Eliza Orne White
- When Abigail was Seven (1932), written by Eliza Orne White
- Four Young Kendalls (1932), written by Eliza Orne White
