= Manitoba Legislative Building =

Building in Manitoba, Canada

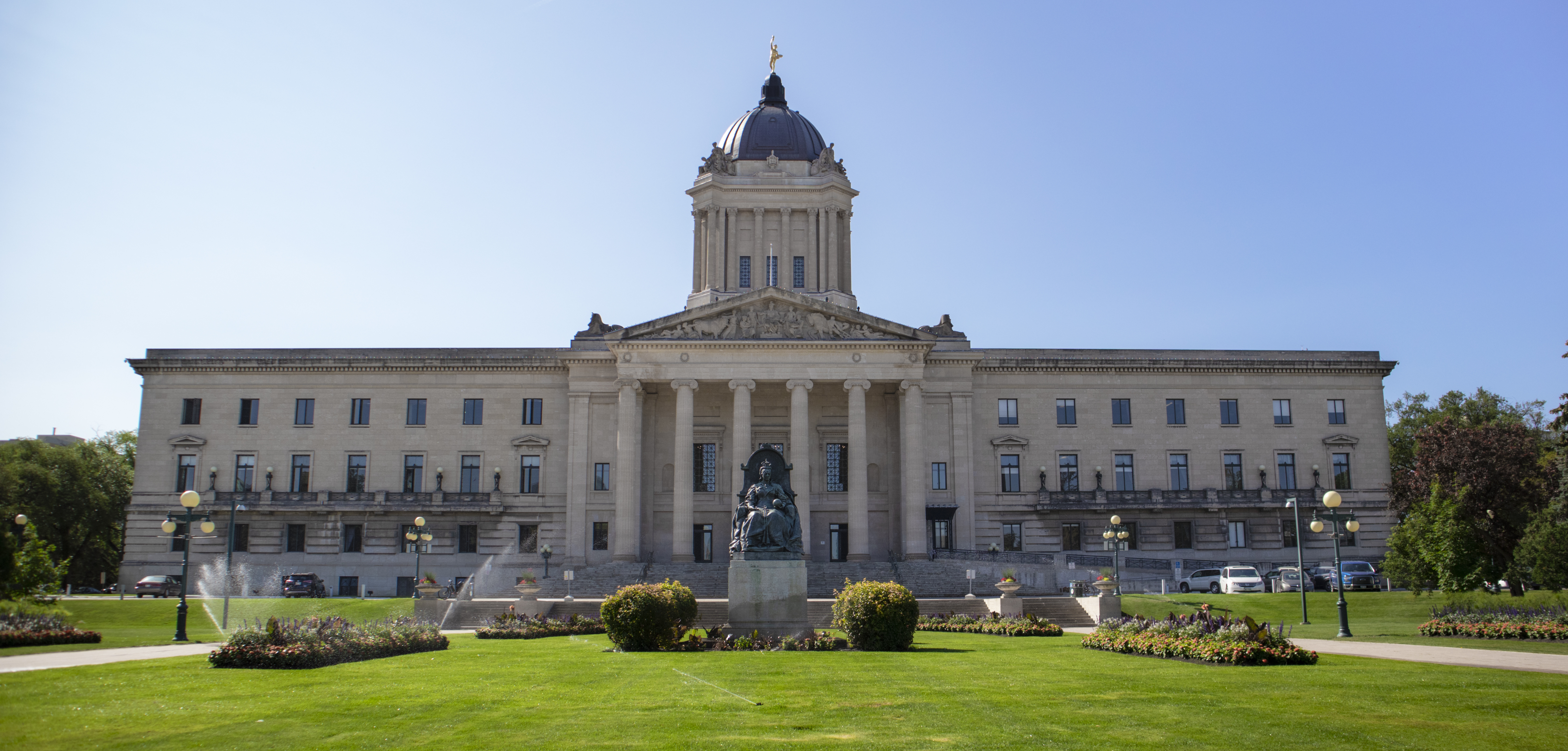
- Manitoba Legislative Building

General information
- Architectural style: Neoclassical
- Location: 450 Broadway, Winnipeg, Manitoba, Canada
- Coordinates: 49°53′04″N 97°08′49″W
- Construction started: 1913; 113 years ago
- Opened: 15 July 1920; 106 years ago
- Cost: C$8,075,865 (1921 est.) ($133 million in 2025 dollars)

Height
- Height: 242 ft (74 m)

Technical details
- Floor area: 250,000 sq ft (23,000 m^{2})

Design and construction
- Architects: Frank Worthington Simon & Henry Boddington III

Other information
- Public transit: Winnipeg Transit; F6 D14 D15 D19

The Manitoba Legislative Building (French: Palais législatif du Manitoba), originally named the Manitoba Parliament Building, is the meeting place of the Legislative Assembly of Manitoba, located in central Winnipeg, as well as being the twelfth provincial heritage site of Manitoba. Along with the Legislative Assembly, the building also accommodates the offices for Manitoba's Lieutenant Governor and the Executive Council.

The neoclassical, Beaux-Arts-style building was completed in 1920 along with its famed Golden Boy, a gold-covered bronze statue based on the style of the Roman god Mercury (Greek: Hermes) that sits at the top of the building's cupola. Standing at 77 metres (253 ft) tall, it was designed and built by Frank Worthington Simon (1862–1933) and Henry Boddington III, along with other masons and many skilled craftsmen. With the abolition of the Legislative Council in 1876, the third building has a single chamber.

== History ==
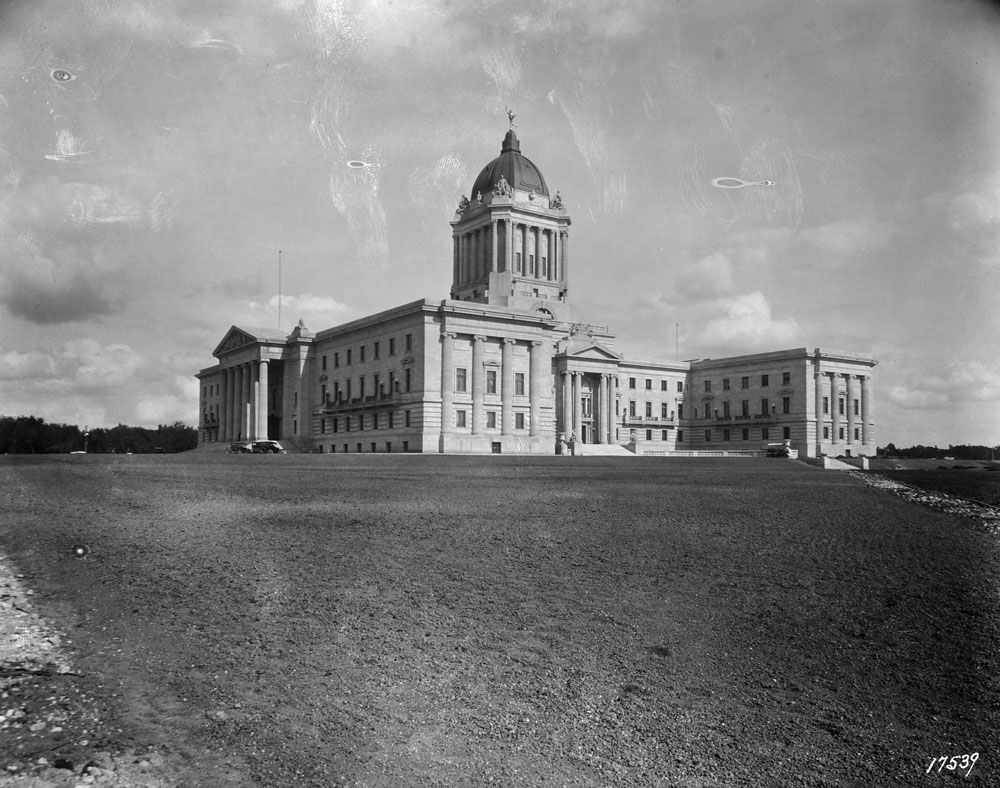
Manitoba Legislative Building

The current building is the third facility used by Manitoba's legislative assembly. The first was a log structure located at the residence of A.G.B. Bannatyne at Main Street and McDermot Avenue until its destruction by fire in 1873. Temporary facilities were used until 1884, when the second building was opened north of Government House, on the same grounds as the current Legislative Building. With the opening of the third Legislative Building, the second building was no longer required. It was thus used as classroom space for the nearby University of Manitoba until 1920, when it was demolished. On the site of this building was also a statue of Queen Victoria which was commissioned after her death in 1904 for C$15,000. (This statue would be moved to the front of the current building's grounds.)

By 1909, Manitoba sought a larger and more impressive building for its legislature, considering the province's booming economy and population that had expanded sevenfold since 1881. In its 1911 annual report, the Department of Public Works said that the "congested state of all the Departments in the Legislative Buildings renders necessary the erection of more commodious buildings at the earliest possible date."

In 1911, the Manitoba government announced an architectural competition to all architects who were subjects of the British Empire. A grand prize of C$10,000 and a commission of $100,000 was offered for the best design for the new Manitoba Legislative Building. The cost for the new building was to be $2,000,000. Of the 67 submissions, Frank Worthington Simon, a former student at the École des Beaux-Arts, had his design chosen for the construction of the impressive structure.

=== Construction ===
Construction began in the summer of 1913, with excavation work beginning in July. After five weeks of excavation, removing 16,000 m^{3} (21,000 cubic yards) of soil in 31 days, the site for the building was moved 13 m (43 feet) south and the terrace adjacent to the building was raised by 0.61 metres (2 ft). Manitoba Tyndall stone was quarried at Garson, Manitoba, about 20 kilometres (12 mi) northeast of Winnipeg. By 1914, 1,231 architectural drawings had been created for the project. On 3 June 1914, the north-east cornerstone ceremony, which was commonly done by masons, was laid by contractor Thomas Kelly.

The construction of the massive building suffered setbacks, however, and took almost 7 years to complete. Obstacles included labour and funding shortages brought on by the First World War, as well as labour unrest during the Winnipeg General Strike. Construction was further slowed due to Kelly stealing many of the materials to build his own house three blocks away. Such scandal inspired a royal commission calling to investigate the building's construction, subsequently bring on the resignation of a Premier Rodmond Roblin and a change of government. As result of the above circumstances in part, the building was not ready for partial occupancy until 1919.

The Golden Boy was installed in November 1919. On the west side of the grounds were the Fort Osborne Barracks and Drill Shed, which were not demolished until after the Legislature was completed.

Final costs of the construction were at C$9,379,000: an itemized statement issued by the Department of Public Works included $150,000.00 for furnishings and finishings; $219,551.29 for plumbing, heating and ventilation; $157,172.72 for electrical work; and $296,023.59 for repairing defective work.

=== Post-construction ===
Manitoba has every reason to be proud of her new Parliament Buildings at Winnipeg, for it is perhaps the most imposing structure in Western Canada and one of the most outstanding pieces of architecture in the whole Dominion.

— Western Canada Contractor (1921)

Government departments and staff moved into the building prior to its formal completion. Among others, the east and west ends of the North Wing had been closed in and occupied by the Comptroller-General, Game Guardian, Noxious Weeds Commissioner, and the Superintendent of Buildings and Moving Picture Censor Board. In 1917, half the basement, 3 floors in the northeast wing, and 1 in the northwest wing were occupied. Though not complete, the interior would be in enough shape that the forthcoming Legislature session could be held in the building with reasonable amount of comfort. The Assembly would therefore have its first meeting in the new building on 22 January 1919, using the new chamber until 27 March, after which it was finally decorated.

In September 1919, the building was unofficially opened by the Prince of Wales during a reception held in his honour. On 15 July 1920, on the 50th anniversary of Manitoba's entry into Confederation, opening ceremonies were performed by Sir James Aikins, then Lieutenant-Governor of Manitoba.

During the Great Depression, a portion of the Legislature's grounds was given over to vegetable gardens. A total of 82 plots for unemployed men were laid out in the spring of 1935.

On 12 May 1989, the building was designated as Manitoba Provincial Heritage Site (number 12) by Bonnie Mitchelson, the province's Minister of Culture, Heritage and Recreation.

=== Later events ===
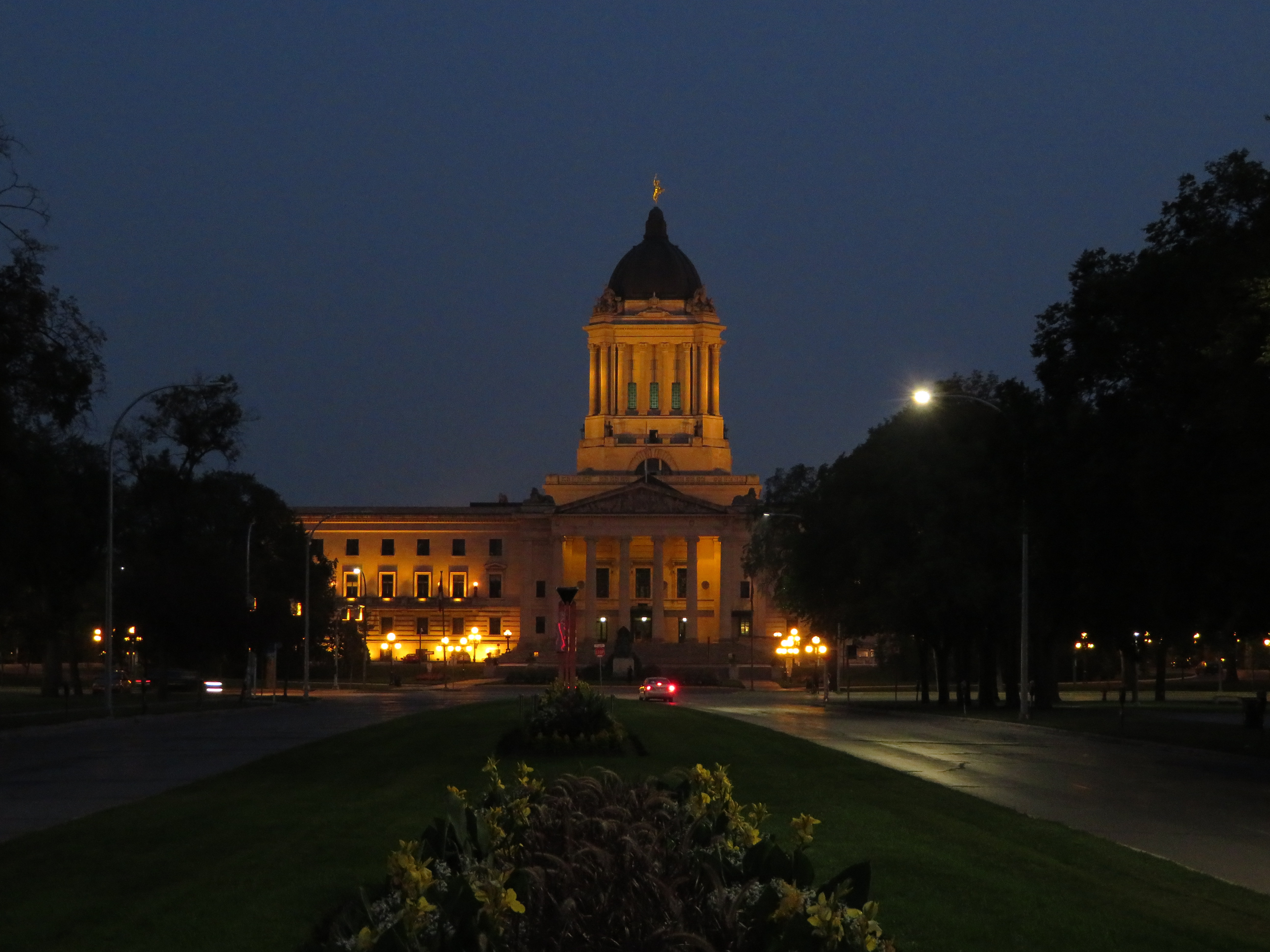
Manitoba Legislative Building illuminated at night

One of the building's many plaques, commemorating Manitoba's entrance into confederation, went missing in October 1974.

In June 1994, work began on repairing the steps at all four entrances of the building. On 4 October 1995, Governor General Roméo LeBlanc officially opened the Manitoba Plaza on the south grounds of the building, commemorating the 125th anniversary of the province.

The Legislative Building has been used many times as a set for films and television productions, including The Diviners (1993) in 1990 and Capote (2005) in 2004. Along with being used as a library, the Reading Room has been used to portray a courtroom and law office. The 2003 Governor General's New Year's Message was recorded in the Reading Room.

In the summer of 2002, the building's outer dome received new copper sheathing.

In 2014, the local government stressed about the state of deterioration of the building to the level of life safety concerns. Tree roots, insects and bird feces are identified as the main threats to the building's longevity. However, the cost of reconstruction today would be prohibitive, due to such factors as a shortage of skilled masons.

Both the interior and exterior skylights over the Grand Staircase were replaced in 2012. In March 2015, a military hall of honour opened in the Legislative Building commemorating the Manitoba's regiments who fought World War I. In 2016, work began on the building's first gender-neutral washroom (2nd floor, west side).

In November 2007, Manitoba became the first legislature in the country to install an accessibility ramp at its front entrance. Nonetheless, in May 2017, Rick Hansen (CEO of the Rick Hansen Institute) criticized the accessibility of the building after MLA Steven Fletcher gave him an official tour. In response, the Chamber was made wheelchair accessible in that very summer. The Chamber floor was raised 76 centimetres (2.49 ft), front-row desks were moved forward to allow wheelchair access between the first two rows, and a ramp was installed on the opposition side of the house. The renovation received a Heritage Winnipeg Conservation Award in 2018.

On 22 January 2020, the province celebrated the 100th anniversary of the first session of the Manitoba Legislature held in the Chamber of the Manitoba Legislative Building.

== Material and dimensions ==
Tyndall stone and marbles are used throughout the building, both including such fossils as sponges, gastropods (snails), cephalopods (mollusks), and trilobites. The largest fossil, found at the east portico, is 1 m (3 ft) wide and 30 cm (1 ft) high.

The estimated weight of the building, constructed with a steel frame, is 243,851,258 kg (24,000 tons).

Throughout the exterior and interior of the building are examples of Fibonacci Sequence, Golden Ratio and Sacred Geometry. There are two domes to the building: the outer dome; and an inner dome which is seen when standing in the Rotunda. A tunnel running under Winnipeg's Broadway Avenue connects the Legislative Building with the city's central powerhouse. It is part of a publicly inaccessible system of tunnels linking other provincial government buildings with the powerhouse, which supplies heat to all these buildings.

=== Exterior ===
Sunset behind the Manitoba Legislative Building

The total area of the building is 23,000 m^{2} (5.7 acres), with a total height of 74 metres (243 ft) above ground level, topped with a bronze statue of Roman God Mercury (Greek: Hermes) gilded with 23.75-karat gold leaf.

The outer dome is supported by four compound girders that weigh 98,557 kg (97 tons) each.

The Legislative grounds cover 120,000 m^{2} (30 acres) of landscaped grounds. The building rests on 421 concrete caissons, which pass through 14 metres (46 ft) of glacial Lake Agassiz clays before hitting limestone bedrock.

Exterior steps were made from Butler granite quarried in Ontario. In contrast, most of the statuary uses Bedford Limestone from Indiana, which is the oldest stone in the building, dating to slightly more than 2.5 billion years ago.

=== Interior ===
The building's floor area is 24,959 m^{2} (6.168 acres), containing about 198,218 m^{3} (259,259 cubic yards). The basic floor plan of the building forms the letter H contained in a rectangle 100 by 103 metres (328.1 ft × 337.9 ft).

Marbles that were used in the building contain fossils, and include Tennessee marble for flooring, Botticino marble from Italy for the Grand Staircase, and Ordovician Black Marble, likely from Vermont, for other interior decorative purposes. According to Frank Worthington Simon, the building's architect, hardwoods used for doors and trim included birch for the basement, oak for the first and third floors, and walnut for the second floor. Moreover, pneumatic clocks, controlled by a central clock, were installed throughout the building, and elements in the building's electric light fixtures include clawed and cloven feet, cobras, and lion heads.

== Exterior architecture and design ==
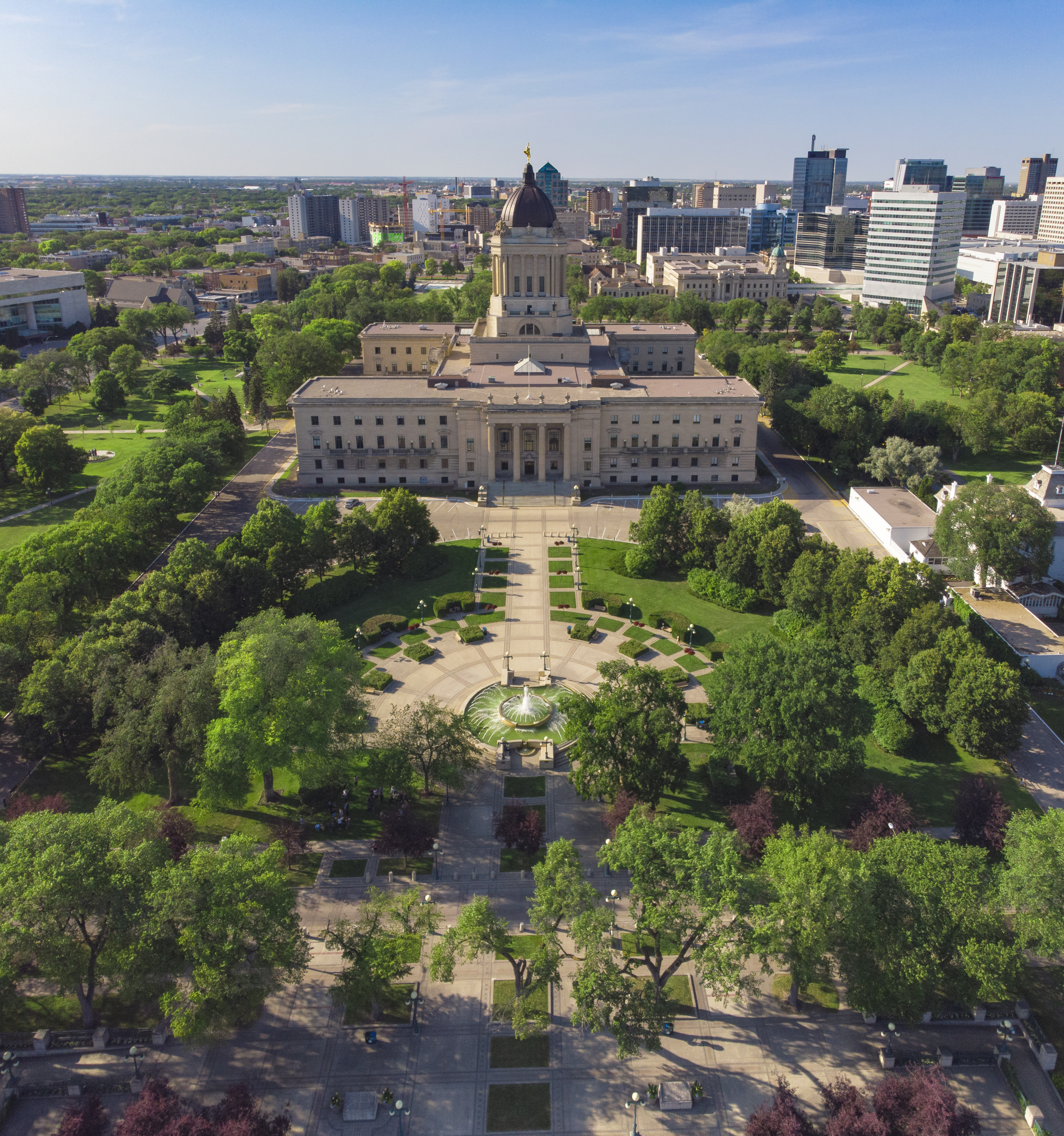
Aerial view of the Manitoba Legislative Building

The building's design can be classified as a neoclassical architectural style, either Beaux-Arts or Neo-Grec.

=== Pediment ===
On the north side of the Legislative Building, above the six Ionic columns, is the main pediment, the figures of which were designed by Scottish sculptor Albert Hemstock Hodge and carved by the Piccirilli Brothers of New York. Above the main pediment, flanking both sides are two Egyptian sphinxes facing both east and west. Carved onto a flat piece of stone, just below the chin, in Egyptian hieroglyphics, is "The everlasting manifestation of the Sun God Ra, the good God who gives life."

Describing its central figure as a representation of Manitoba, Frank Worthington Simon wrote of the pediment:

[In the left hand corner,] Enterprise beckons the workers to the Land of Promise. [A bull is] led by Europe, signifying the immigration from Europe and adjoining the central figure is a group of father, mother and child, the new family in the land. In the right hand corner are two figures embracing and clasping a jar, whence issues a stream of water. These represent the confluence of the Red and Assiniboine Rivers fertilizing the earth. Next is a ploughman with his horse, tilling the soil, whilst the male and female figures bring the fruits of the Soil of Manitoba.

In the bottom-left corner of the pediment is the Indolent Man, with a half-kneeling woman, the spirit of progress, beckoning the Indolent Man into the new land of promise. Next is the goddess Europa leading a bull, symbolizing Canada's European heritage and immigration. To the right of Europa, a man, woman and child symbolizing the colonization of a new land. Seated in the centre is Lady Manitoba with the rays of the sun behind her. Lady Manitoba closely resembles the fertility goddesses Ishtar and Demeter, both patron deities of agriculture. To the west is Neptune's trident symbolizing the Pacific Ocean; to the east is a ship's wheel symbolizing the Atlantic Ocean. Adjacent to Lady Manitoba are a man and a woman laden with wheat and fruit, products of the soil. Next is a muscular male figure with a team of powerful horses and a primitive plough tilling the soil. Finally in the bottom right corner are two entwined female figures representing the Red and Assiniboine Rivers.

=== Entrance and grounds ===
On the outside of the building, at the four corners of the base of the dome are representations of Agriculture, Art, Industry, and Learning, designed by William Birnie Rhind of Scotland and carved by F. A. Purdy of Vermont. Statues at both the east and west entrances were designed and carved by the Piccirilli Brothers: the east is flanked by statues of La Verendrye and Lord Selkirk; and the west, by statues of General James Wolfe and Lord Dufferin.

On both the east and west porticos sit figures representing war and peace. On the east side, with engraved images of weapons of war, are two male figures, one a native warrior with an eagle head-dress, another a Roman soldier, and on the west side there are two female figures for peace. Each pair guards a chest, rumoured to represent the Ark of the Covenant because of the proper proportions as mentioned in the ancient Hebrew texts.

At the front of the grounds was a statue of Queen Victoria, toppled on 1 July 2021. On the south grounds, including the fountain, the Manitoba Plaza was officially opened in commemoration of the 125th anniversary of the province. Also in this area, facing the Assiniboine River, sits the sculpture of Louis-Riel, leader of Métis, created by Miguel Joyal. The statue was put in place on 12 May 1996, on the 126th anniversary of the passing of Manitoba Act, and it replaced an earlier statue that had stood for 24 years (which is now located at St. Boniface College). There are 6 greenhouses on the grounds, which grow 75,000 bedding plants annually with 40,000 planted on the grounds itself, and the rest distributed to other government buildings.

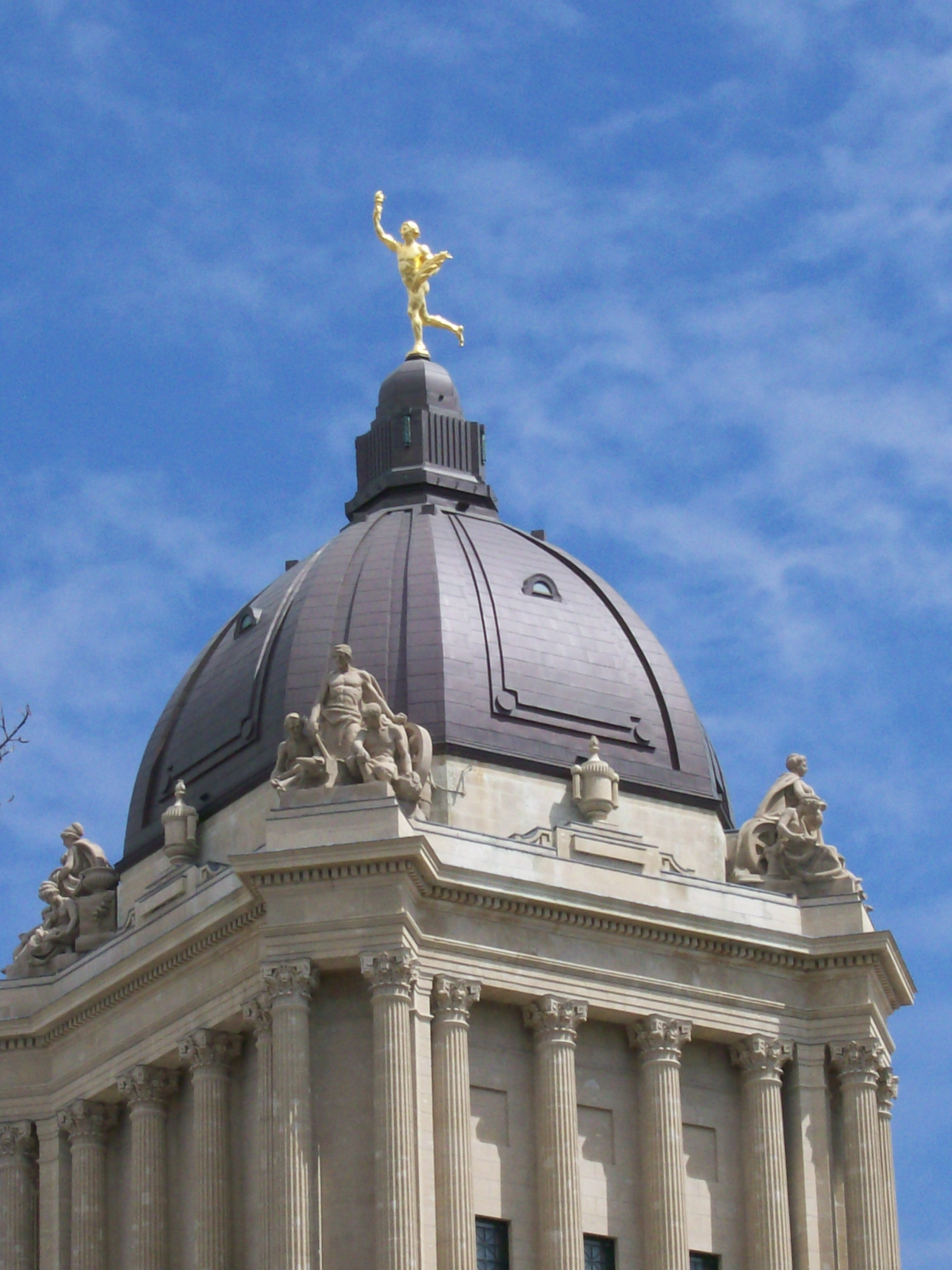
The Golden Boy, or "Eternal Youth"

=== The Golden Boy ===
Each one of the four corners of the copper dome supporting the Golden Boy has a stonework grouping representing the four elements of alchemy, earth, air, fire and water. They are identified as Agriculture, Science, Industry and Art. The dome is 68.18 metres (223.69 ft) above the main floor. The height of the central tower without the Golden Boy is 74 metres (242.8 ft). The statue was first installed in 1919, originally called Eternal Youth, and sculpted by Parisian artist Georges Gardet. The Golden Boy was last regilded and refurbished in 2002, and is illuminated by floodlights.

== Interior architecture and design ==
The building has various empty niches where statues were planned but never installed. There are various plaques on the walls of the building commemorating events in Manitoba history.

=== Main entrance and the Grand Staircase ===
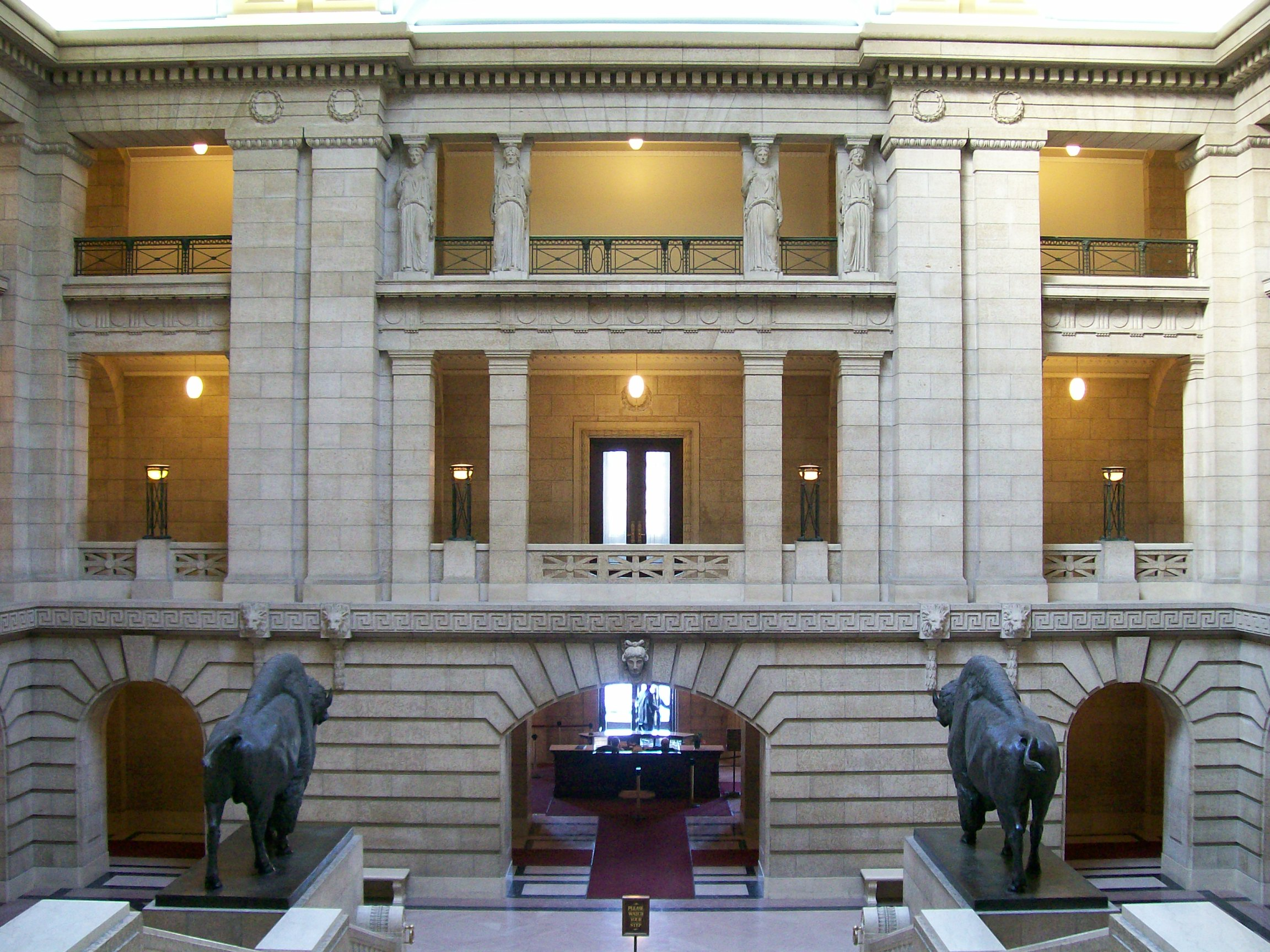
The Grand Staircase, north side

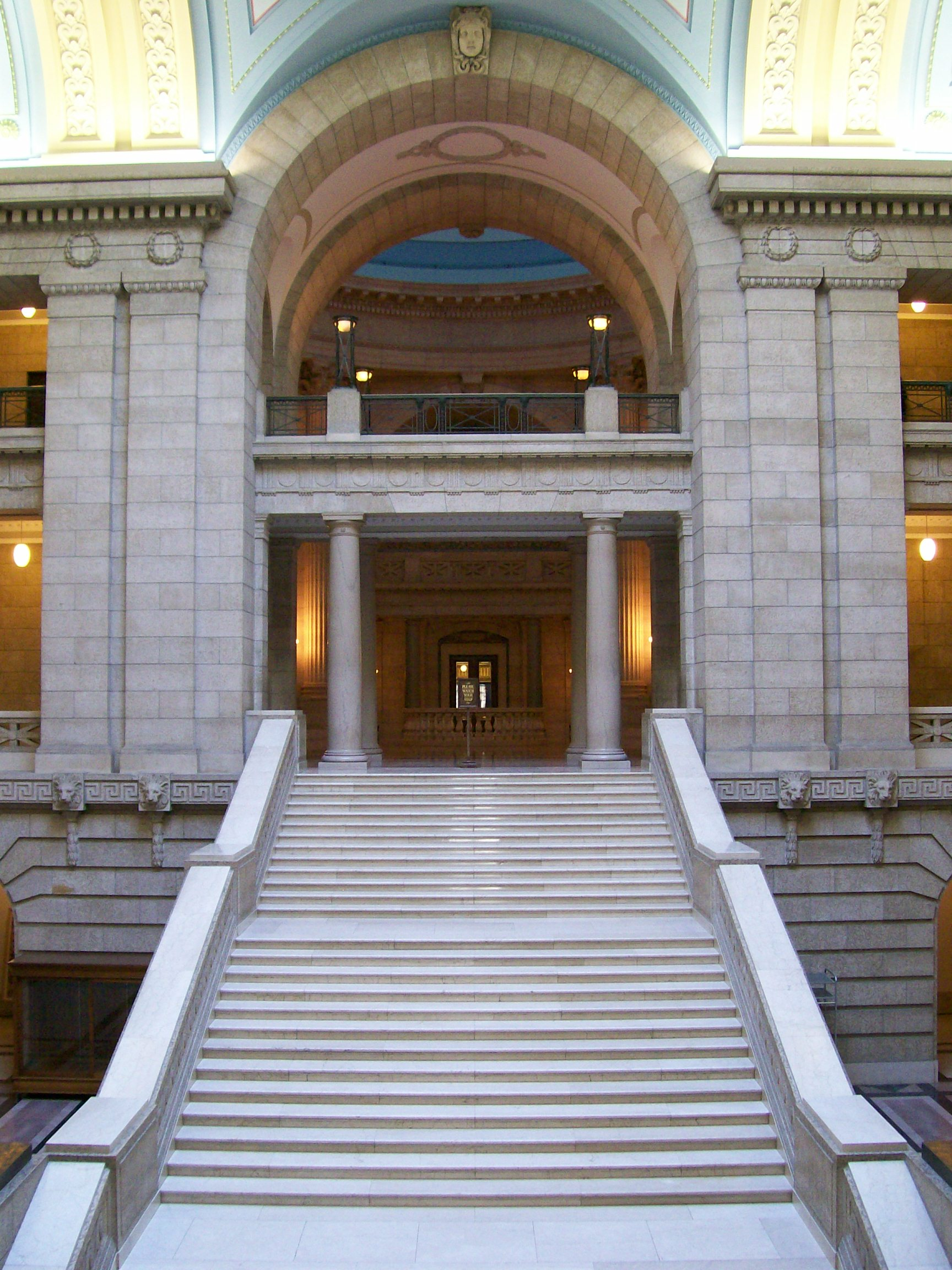
The Grand Staircase, south side

The main entrance is a perfectly square room measuring 66.6 feet (20.3 m) on each side, which is meant to represent the numerological number 666, which are all the numbers added from one to 36, which is the square of 6, in mathematics, geometry, and arithmetic.

Within the main entrance is the Grand Staircase, which is 6.1 metres (20 ft) wide and composed of three flights of 13 steps each. The steps are made from Botticino marble and brown-veined Carrara marble, reportedly the finest marble in the world.

Above the Grand Staircase is two skylights, an inner and an outer structure. The ceiling is made of a glass atrium to allow natural sunlight to illuminate the room.

Flanking the steps are life-size North American bison, a symbol of the province of Manitoba, meant to represent the sacred bulls that guard temple entrances. Made of solid bronze and cast at the Roman Bronze Works in New York City, they were modelled by Georges Gardet, creator of the Golden Boy. Each bison weighs 2,268 kilograms (2½ tons). Legend has it that, to install the bison safely without damaging the marble floors, the main entrance was flooded and left to freeze. Both bison were then placed on enormous slabs of ice cut from the Assiniboine River and safely slid into the building. The bison are one example of apotropaic icons in the Grand Staircase.

Above the south entrance to the legislature lobby is the head of Medusa. Over the north entrance facing Medusa is the bust of Athena, Greek goddess of war, embodiment of democracy and also the protector of cities. Around the perimeter of the room are 14 lion heads and 8 cattle skulls at the edge of the ceiling. Around the second-floor balcony, lamps rise from the balustrades, each containing 13 bulbs—12 of them around 1, representing the Twelve Apostles and Jesus.

The third floor facing the Grand Staircase is supported by two pairs of caryatids (columns sculpted as female figures) with each figure holding a scroll and key. These figures located on the third floor were carved by the Piccirilli Brothers of New York, using models prepared by Albert Hodge of London, England.

=== Rotunda ===
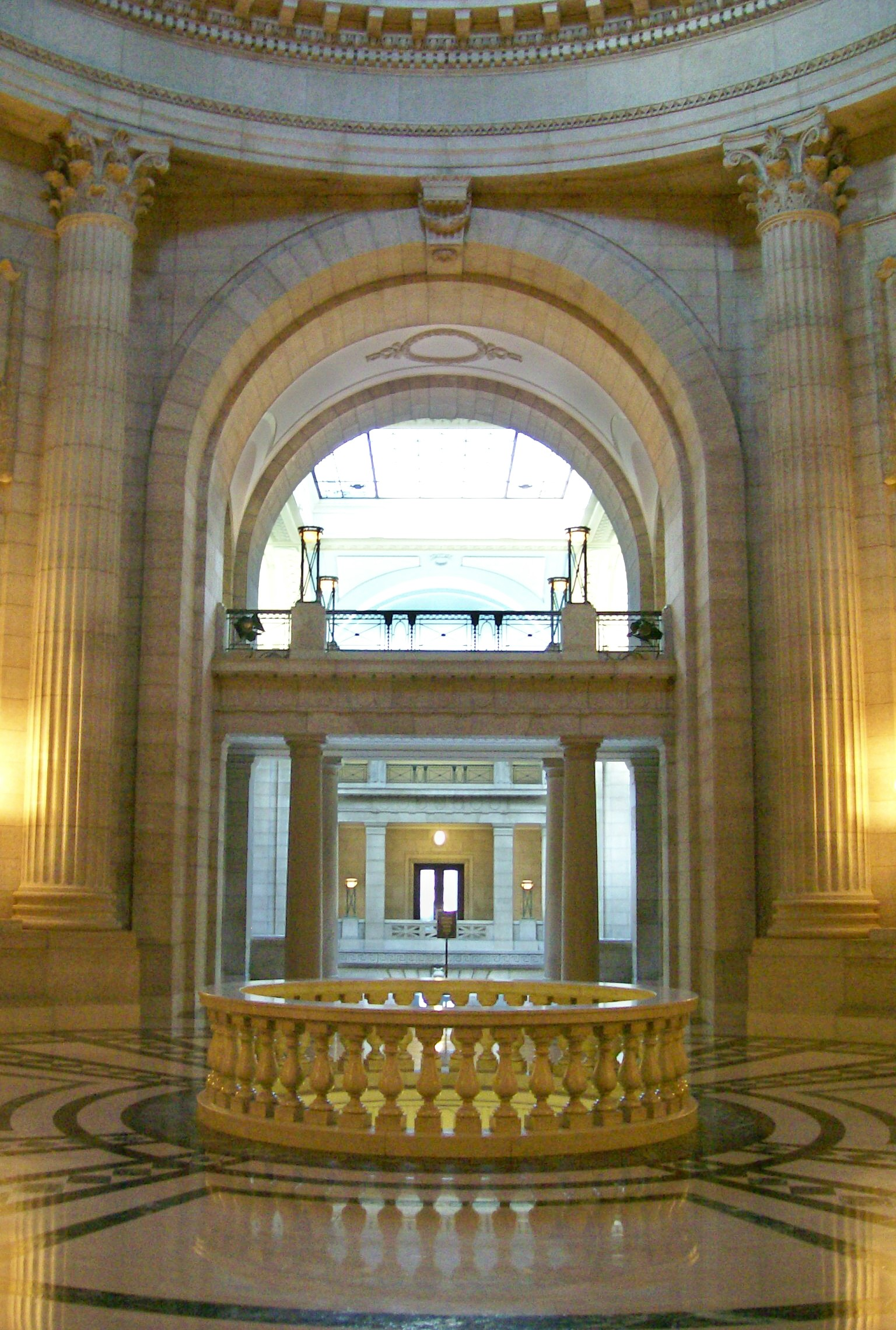
Rotunda, north side

The antechamber at the head of the Grand Staircase provides a formal approach to the legislative chamber. Four pairs of Corinthian columns rise from the floor to the cornice surrounding the base of the rotunda, itself measuring 20 meters (64 ft) in diameter and 26 meters (84 ft) high. Within the dome above are four panels containing 5 gold rosettes.

Between each pair of columns are busts of Hermes. The floor of the dome rotunda is Tennessee marble bordered with black Vermont and verde antique marble.

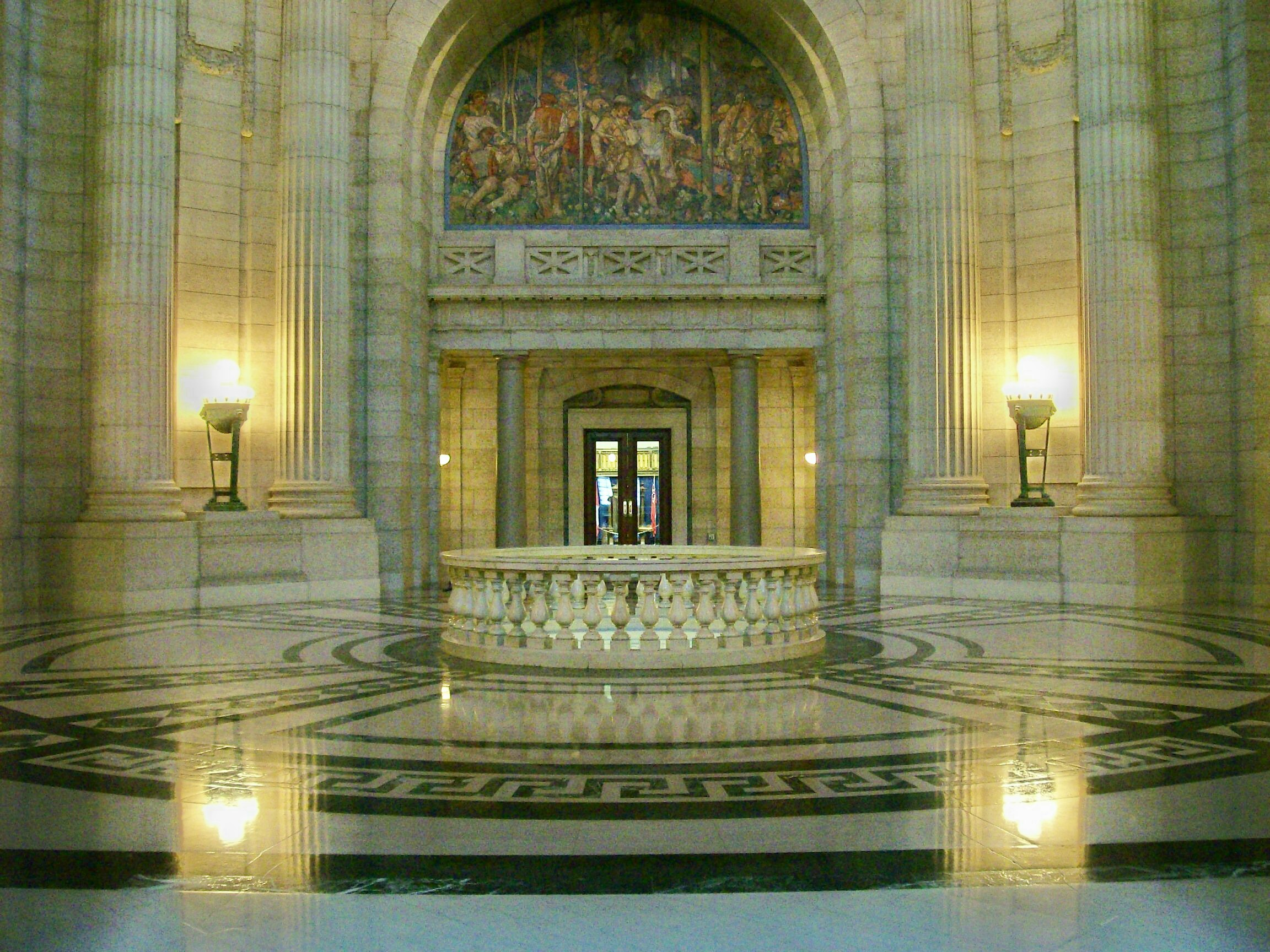
Rotunda, south side

In the centre of the Rotunda is an Italian marble balustrade 4 metres (13 ft) across surrounding the Pool of the Black Star on the floor of the level below, a representation of the altars of the ancient Greeks. The diameter of the circle above the balustrade is also 4 meters, and both align with the Golden Boy above these.

Above the doorway to the Manitoba Assembly is a mural by Frank Brangwyn depicting World War I. In the centre of the painting is a man in tattered rags with his left chest and arm exposed, being helped along by a comrade. Above the men are a faint depiction of The Madonna and child.

=== Pool of the Black Star ===
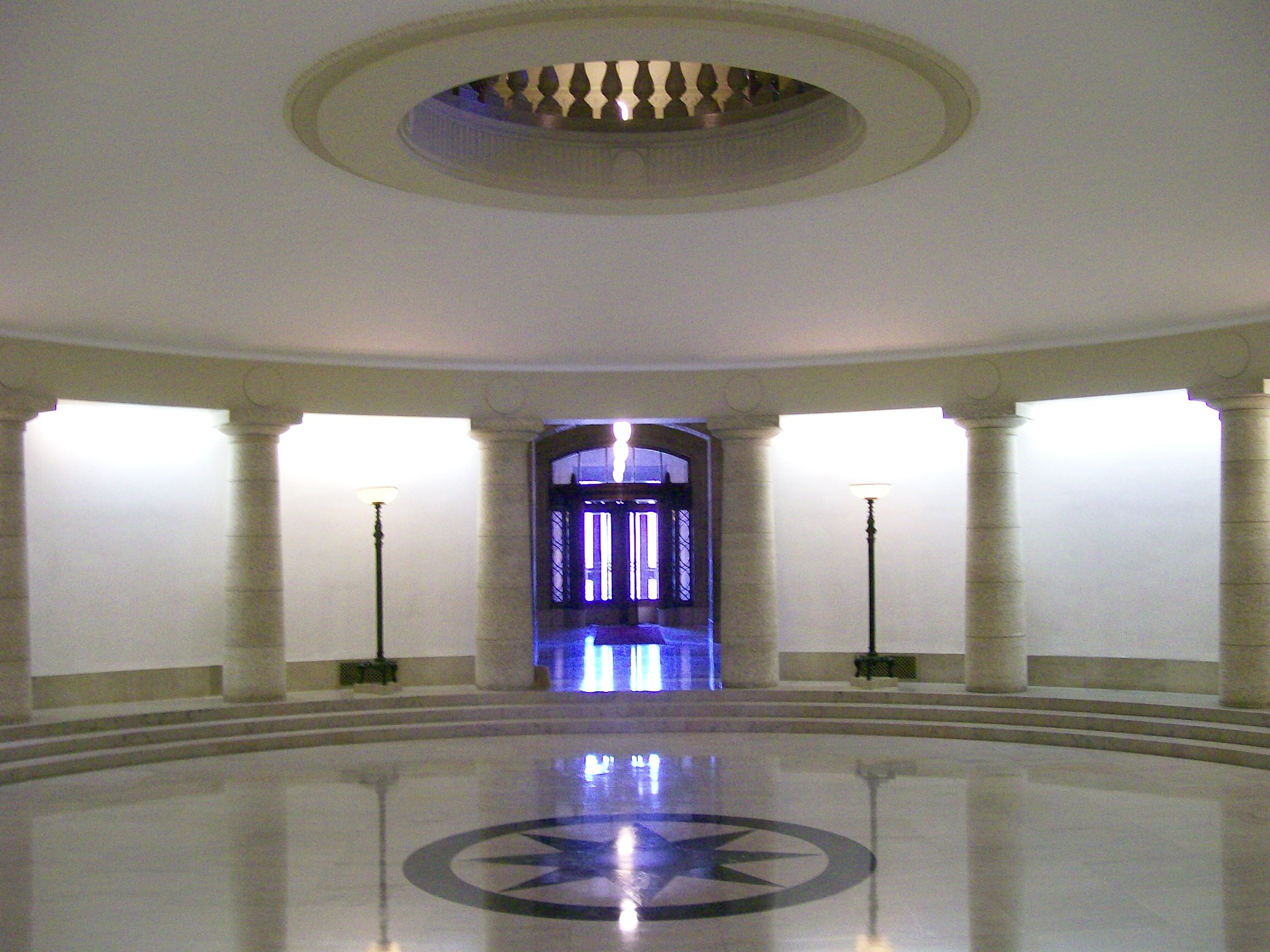
Pool of the Black Star

The Pool of the Black Star is the room below the rotunda with four entrances and marked by 3 steps forming a circumference of the room. The room is circular with a radius of 8.2 metres (27 ft). At the centre of the floor is an 8-pointed black marble star. Directly above in alignment with the Pool of the Black Star is the dome of the building, on which the Golden Boy is mounted outside. The design of the building allows sounds from all over the building to be caught and heard in the circular room, and echoes can be heard by speaking in the room.

Electric light fixtures around the circumference of the Pool of the Black Star have sea creatures on the base, and male and female heads just under the shade.

=== Lieutenant Governor's Reception Room ===
Off the east corridor is the Lieutenant Governor's Reception Room, also known as the Blue Room, which is used by the province's lieutenant governor to receive visiting royalty and foreign dignitaries; the public is barred from entry, save for New Year's Day, when the lieutenant governor typically hosts a levee in the reception room. The Prince of Wales' Chair is reserved for visiting royalty.

Measuring 7.3 metres (24 ft) square, the room is in the Edwardian style, panelled in black American walnut, inlaid with ebony, and has a dentilled cornice and composite columns in each corner. Portraits of Canada's sovereigns and, facing across from each other on the north and south walls, two mirrors in gilt frames decorate the walls. A French gilt chandelier hangs from the ceiling and a carpet, specially hand-woven in Donegal, Ireland, covers the floor.

=== Legislative Chamber ===
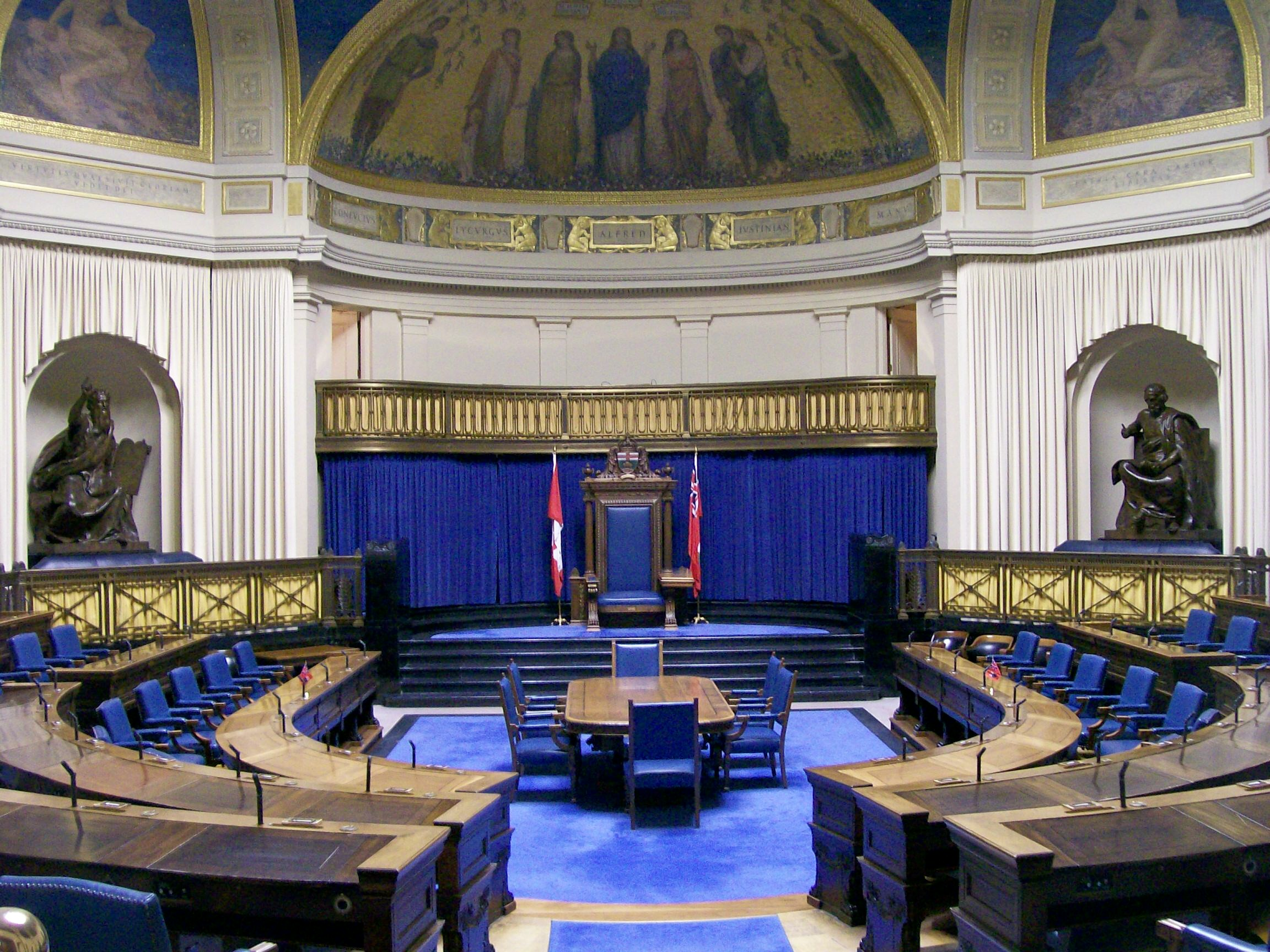
The Legislative Chamber

The Legislative Assembly of Manitoba and the Lieutenant Governor form the Legislature of Manitoba, the legislative branch of government in the Province of Manitoba. Fifty-seven members are elected to this assembly in provincial general elections, all in single-member constituencies with first-past-the-post voting. Originally, in 1870, there were 24 Members of the Legislative Assembly (MLAs), but as the province grew in population and size, more electoral divisions were added. Winnipeg was once the third largest city in Canada, and often called 'Chicago of the North'.

Electric light fixtures flanking the entrance to the chamber have sea creatures on the base, and male and female heads just under the shade. On the Chamber doors are bison escutcheons, designed by Frank Worthington Simon. Although the bison were meant to face each other, only the bison facing to the left were cast, so all the bison face the same way. Above the Chamber entrance is a mural by the British artist Frank Brangwyn, who described it as an allegory of the Canadian effort in World War I. It was installed in March 1921 and underwent restoration in 2014.

Murals inside the Chamber are by New York's Augustus Vincent Tack. Among the figures represented are Justice, Knowledge, and Wisdom; Tolerance & Magnanimity; Fortitude, Prudence, & Temperance; and Faith, Hope, & Charity; as well as Mercy & Understanding, Courage & Vigilance, and Sacrifice & Loyalty.

The Speaker of the Legislative Assembly's chair is located on the south wall below the press gallery of 13 seats. To the right of the speaker is a statue of Moses holding the Ten Commandments, to the left is Solon, a famous lawmaker of ancient Athens. Each statue is made of bronze and sculpted by Georges Gardet.

Manitoba's Legislative Chamber is unique among provincial legislatures in that the Members' benches are grouped in a horseshoe shape. The original desks and chairs of the Chamber are fashioned of walnut with inlaid ebony. They are arranged in three tiers rising from a sunken floor in the centre of the Chamber. Each desk is equipped with a microphone connected to a public address system and a recording machine used in the publication of Hansard, a verbatim report of debates and proceedings in the Legislature. During question period, translators provide simultaneous translation from French to English.

The Chamber is also equipped for video and internet broadcasts of question period and special events such as throne and budget speeches. Even as such changes have brought the assembly into modernity, the original inkwells employed by an earlier generation of Manitoban politicians are still visible.

=== Other rooms and halls ===
Rooms on the east side of the building have odd numbers, while rooms on the west side have even numbers; this regularly confuses new visitors to the building.

==== Lower levels ====
- Basement: Two large vaults are located in the basement. An original copy of the Magna Carta, while not on display at the building, was stored there in 2010.
- The Hall of Honour (first floor, east side) features the Books of Remembrance, which list the names of Canadians who died during the Boer War to the Korean War. Plaques commemorating Manitoban regiments and divisions are also found in the hall.
- The Keystone Gallery (lower level, west side) hosts rotating exhibits that showcase and promote Manitoba art and heritage. In July 2020, a time capsule containing contributions from Members and staff of the building was added to the gallery, and it is to be opened in 2120, on the 200th anniversary of the building.

==== Second floor ====
Found on the second floor on the southwest side of the building are portraits of former Speakers (of the Legislative Assembly and of the Legislative Council), who customarily commissioned them upon retirement. On the northeast wing's second floor are photographs of the Manitoba's Premiers, while painted portraits of the Premiers are housed in the committee rooms on the south side of the building. The names of recipients of the Order of Manitoba can be found on the second floor on the east side hallway. The original mace of Manitoba, which saw service for the first 13 years of the Assembly's history, and its replacement, are the symbols of the Legislature's authority. In September 2019, the two maces went on permanent display in a cabinet on the second floor.

- The Manitoba Room (Room 200; aka the Chandelier Room) is used for special functions. Painted portraits of King George V and Queen Mary, by V.A. Long (1915), hang on either end of the room. On the adjacent walls hang portraits of Queen Elizabeth II and Prince Philip by Dennis Fildes (1962).
- The Reading Room of the Manitoba Legislative Library (Room 260) contains three tiers of book stacks and has space for 25,000 volumes, with additional space under the Chamber. Access to the upper tiers is by two spiral staircases, or by the Room's original elevator.
- The Trailblazers Gallery (2nd floor, west side) was unveiled on 21 August 2018, to honour 18 women who were/are in positions traditionally held by men or who have worked to forge new pathways for women in Manitoba.

== See also ==
- Manitoba Legislature
- Legislative Assembly of Manitoba
- Legislative buildings of Canada
- List of historic places in Winnipeg
- Government House (Manitoba)
- List of National Historic Sites of Canada in Manitoba
