= Eve Borsook =

American art historian (1929–2022)

- Born: 3 October 1929; Toronto, Ontario, Canada
- Died: 31 August 2022 (aged 92)
- Occupation: Art historian

Academic background
- Education: Courtauld Institute of Art
- Thesis: (1956)

Eve Borsook (3 October 1929 – 31 August 2022) was a Canadian-born American art historian, teacher and author, specialising in murals (both wall paintings and mosaics). Her other interests included the history of glass in relation to mosaics, 16th century Florentine ceremonial decoration, and Italian cloister art.

== Early life and education ==
Borsook was born in Toronto, Ontario, Canada on 3 October 1929. Her parents were the English-born biochemist Henry Borsook (1897-1984) and the Austrian-born Lisl (née Hummel). Henry's hobby was art history, which may well have been an early influence on his daughter, for Eve Borsook received an AB in the History of Art from Vassar College, New York, in 1949. She went on to the Institute of Fine Arts, New York University, completing her MA in 1952 with a dissertation on the early Baroque painter Carlo Saraceni (her supervisor was the German art historian, Walter Friedlander). While pursuing her graduate studies, Borsook was also working for the Metropolitan Museum of Art. She then went on to London for her doctoral research on Italian mural painting at the Courtauld Institute of Art, University of London, where her supervisor was the art historian Johannes Wilde. At this time she also had the benefit of a Fulbright scholarship which allowed her to study in Italy. Her PhD thesis, 'Principles of mural decoration in fourteenth century Tuscan fresco cycles', completed in 1956, was published in revised form in 1960.

== Professional work ==
During her early days of research in Italy, Borsook made some long-term contacts which would shape her future career. In particular, she worked with a group of mural conservators in Florence led by Leonetto Tintori (1908-2000), and this relationship was to continue for more than thirty years, resulting in a number of publications. The disastrous flood in Florence in 1966 was another important milestone, which involved her in working for the CRIA (Committee to Rescue Italian Art), an American emergency aid initiative which established its headquarters at the Villa I Tatti, former home of the American art critic and connoisseur Bernard Berenson (1865–1959). From here she collaborated and liaised with many visiting conservators who had arrived in Florence to take part in the restoration work, as well as with local Florentine conservation experts and museum staff. One particularly memorable task was the retrieval and drying out of around 30,000 wet glass negatives.

Much of Borsook's later work has also taken place at the Villa I Tatti (the Harvard University Center for Italian Renaissance Studies): she was appointed research associate there (1981-1989), then senior research associate (2003-2015), and was later senior research associate emeritus. She has also taught as a visiting professor at the New York University Institute of Fine Arts, as well as other institutes in the USA, Italy and Australia. She declined a Samuel H. Kress Professorship at the National Gallery of Art in Washington DC as the fellowship would have involved a year's absence from her work in Italy.

Photographs contributed by Borsook to the Conway Library are currently being digitised by the Courtauld Institute of Art as part of the Courtauld Connects project.

In 1999 more than 20 art historians provided essays for the publication of a book titled Mosaics of friendship: studies in art and history for Eve Borsook as a 70th birthday tribute to Borsook.

== Personal life and death ==
Borsook died on 31 August 2022, at the age of 92.

== Publications ==
=== Books ===
- The Mural Painters of Tuscany. From Cimabue to Andrea del Sarto. London: Phaidon. 1960. OCLC 973461045.
  - The Mural Painters of Tuscany. Oxford Studies in the History of Art and Architecture (2nd, fully revised and enlarged ed.). Oxford: Clarendon Press. 1980. ISBN 0-198-17301-6.
- Decor in Florence for the Entry of Charles VIII of France. Florence: publisher not identified. 1961. OCLC 84602931.
- Art and Politics at the Medici Court I. Florence. 1965. OCLC 82690008.
- The Companion Guide to Florence (6th revised ed.). Suffolk: Companion Guides. 1997 [1966]. ISBN 978-1-900639-19-4.
- Ambrogio Lorenzetti (in Italian). Florence: Sadea-Sansoni. 1966. OCLC 489704951.
- Drawings for the Funeral of Cosimo I de' Medici. Florence. 1966. OCLC 79910394.
- Art and Politics at the Medici Court II. Florence. 1967. OCLC 84185817.
- Maestro Francesco and a Portrait of the Signoria of Florence. Berlin: De Gruyter. 1968. OCLC 81117097.
- Art and Politics at the Medici Court III: Funeral Decor for Philip II of Spain. c. 1968. OCLC 1006060221.
- Art and Politics at the Medici Court IV: Funeral Decor for Henry IV of France. Florenz: s.n. 1969. OCLC 469995788.
- Documents for Filippo Strozzi's Chapel in Santa Maria Novella and other related papers I. London. 1970. OCLC 78003599.
- ——; Bonsignori, Bonsignore; Michelozzi, Bernardo (1973). The Travels of Bernardo Michelozzi and Bonsignore Bonsignori in the Levant (1497–98). London. OCLC 83074525.
- Fra Filippo Lippi and the Murals for Prato Cathedral. Florence: Kunsthistorisches Institut. 1975. OCLC 19541926.
- Cults and Imagery at Sant'Ambrogio in Florence (in Italian). Florence. 1981. OCLC 79710354.
- A Florentine scrittoio for Diomede Carafa. New York: Abrams. 1981. OCLC 886326138.
- Jacopo di Cione and the Guild Hall of the Judges and Notaries in Florence. London. 1982. OCLC 78839585.
- Art and Business in Renaissance Florence and Venice. Weinheim: Verlag Chemie. 1983. OCLC 78637346.
- Effects of Technical Developments on the History of Italian Mural Painting of the Fourteenth and Fifteenth Centuries. Bologna: Edizioni Clueb. 1983. OCLC 78928708.
- Technical innovation and the development of Raphael's style in Rome. 1986. OCLC 81063684.
- Messages in Mosaic: The Royal Programmes of Norman Sicily, 1130–1187. Oxford/New York: Oxford University Press. 1988. ISBN 978-0-19-817504-9.
- Problems of Style and Technique in the Sistine Chapel. 1991. OCLC 82689920.
- La sauvegarde des peintures murales en Italie de 1960 à 1993: un bilan (in French). Paris: Centre National de la Recherche Scientifique. 1995. OCLC 464173948.
- Rhetoric or Reality: Mosaics as Expressions of a Metaphysical Idea. Florence. 2000. OCLC 464207118.
- L'oro dei poveri: la paglia nell'arredo liturgico e nelle immagini devozionali dell'Italia centrale fra il 1670 e il 1870 (in Italian). Florence: Polistampa. 2000. ISBN 978-88-8304-185-3. OCLC 797798305.
- The Power of Illusion: Fictive Tombs in Santa Maria del Fiore. Fiesole: Cadmo. 2001. OCLC 551115310.
- Collected Writings, 1954–2004. 2005. OCLC 464218722.

=== Selected articles ===
- "Documents Concerning the Artistic Associates of Santa Maria della Scala in Rome". Burlington Magazine. ??: 270–275. 1954. OCLC 888561975.
- "The Frescoes at San Leonardo al Lago". Burlington Magazine. 98: 351–358. 1956. OCLC 887178916.
- "A Note on Masaccio in Pisa". Burlington Magazine. ??: 212–215. 1961. OCLC 888561949.
- "The Great Age of Fresco". Burlington Magazine. 111 (794): 303–304. 1969. OCLC 5548479177.
- "Addendum to the Funeral of Philip II". Mitteilungen des Kunsthistorischen Institutes in Florenz: 247–250. 1969. OCLC 886750694.
- "The Portrait of Carlo de' Medici: A Correction". Mitteilungen des Kunsthistorischen Institutes in Florenz: ??. 1975. OCLC 888561900.
- "Castagno". Burlington Magazine. 122 (933): 839–840. 1980. OCLC 5548456383.
