= Government House (Manitoba) =

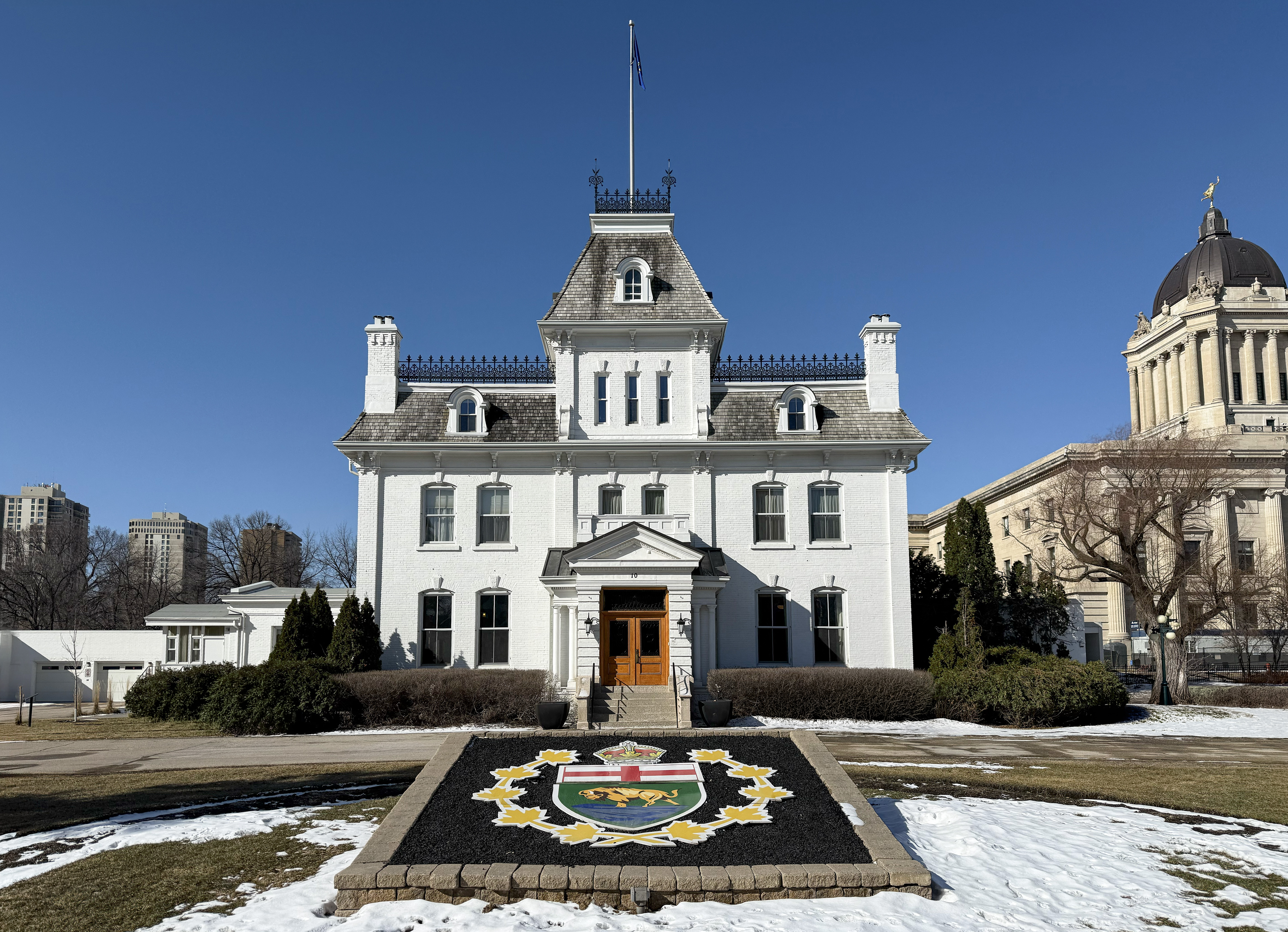
- Government House

General information
- Architectural style: Victorian Second Empire
- Location: 10 Kennedy Street; Winnipeg, Manitoba; R3C 1S4
- Coordinates: 49.883896°N 97.145131°W
- Construction started: 1883
- Cost: $24,000
- Client: The Queen in Right of Canada (Victoria)
- Owner: The King in Right of Manitoba (Charles III)

Technical details
- Structural system: Timber framing and load-bearing masonry
- Size: 1,858 m² (20,000 ft²)

Government House of Manitoba (French: Résidence du Lieutenant-Gouverneur) is the official residence of the lieutenant governor of Manitoba, and is located in the provincial capital of Winnipeg. It stands in the provincial capital, on the grounds of the Manitoba Legislative Building, at 10 Kennedy Street; unlike other provincial Government Houses in Canada, this gives Manitoba's vice-regal residence a prominent urban setting, though it is surrounded by gardens.

== History ==
Prior to the foundation of Manitoba, the Lieutenant Governor of the Northwest Territories occupied a designated residence within the walls of Upper Fort Garry; a house that was, at one point, used by Louis Riel as president of the provisional government of Red River. After the new province joined Confederation on 15 July 1870, a structure five kilometres outside of Winnipeg was leased for use as the lieutenant governor's residence, known as Silver Heights, but it was found unsuitable, given its size and distance from the capital. Instead, the lieutenant governor remained at Upper Fort Garry until the present Government House was completed.

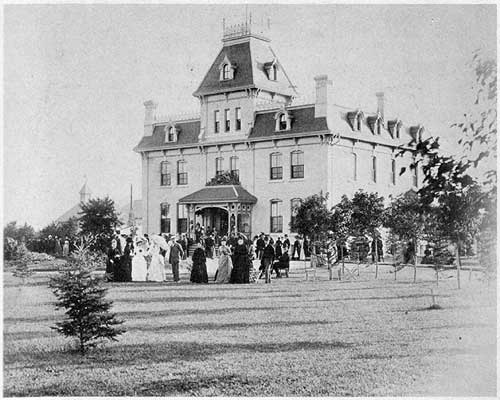
A garden party on the front lawn of Government House, 9 August 1889

The house there, however, was in constant need of repair; after $10,000 was spent on the structure in 1873, Alexander Morris wrote to the federal Minister of Public Works: "You can fancy the state of the house when I tell you there was five feet of water in the cellar till middle of July. Year before till middle of August..." Further, as the population of the province was increasing, the need for public buildings became more pressing, and a delegation travelled to Ottawa to discuss with the Queen's Privy Council for Canada the matter of parliament allocating funds for a new legislative assembly and Government House for Manitoba. This was approved, and Thomas Seaton Scott, the Dominion architect, immediately set about drawing up plans for the structures.

The current provincial vice-regal residence was constructed in 1883, at a cost to the federal Crown of $23,995. However, the building was two years later, on 10 June, purchased by the provincial Crown for $1, with the provision that the house be used as a residence for the viceroy "and for no other purpose," as written by John A. Macdonald at the bottom of the Order in Council transferring the house. In 1901, the vice-regal home played host to the Duke and Duchess of York (later King George V and Queen Mary), as well as the Duchess' brother, Prince Alexander of Teck (who would later become Governor General of Canada); Prince Edward, Prince of Wales (later King Edward VIII), and Prince George, Duke of Kent, in 1919 and 1941; and King George VI was the first reigning monarch to reside at Government House when he and his wife, Queen Elizabeth, stopped in Winnipeg during their cross-country tour of Canada in 1939; from Government House, the King broadcast over the radio a speech to the British Commonwealth, the table at which he sat still in the residence. Their daughter, Queen Elizabeth II, her husband, Prince Philip, Duke of Edinburgh, and each of their children have also stayed at Government House over the years.

The architect Frank Worthington Simon included in his plans for the Manitoba Legislative Building a new Government House, to be constructed on the bank of the Assiniboine River, opposite the parliament. This plan never came to fruition, however, and the Victorian Government House was adapted over time to suit the lieutenant governor's changing needs. In 1978, the mansion was designated as a historical structure by the Manitoba Heritage Council and in 1999, at the initiative of Shirley Liba, wife of Lieutenant Governor Peter Liba, the house underwent a major renovation, in which many of the original features of the mansion were uncovered and restored.

== Use ==
Government House is where visiting dignitaries are greeted and often stay while in Winnipeg. It is also where numerous vice-regal events take place, such as the bestowing of provincial awards or inductions into the Order of Manitoba, as well as luncheons, dinners, receptions, and speaking engagements. It is also at the vice-regal residence that the lieutenant governor drops the writs of election and swears-in new members of the Executive Council. The viceroy's office is located at the Legislative Building, behind Government House; it is there that legislation is given Royal Assent and the lieutenant governor meets with the premier.

== Architecture and interiors ==
Manitoba's Government house is a structure of solid masonry walls and timber floor framing, the original block being 18.3 metres (60 ft) square and four storeys in height, counting the basement level, covering a total of approximately 20,000 sq ft (1,900 m^{2}), including the tower. The volume and its facade composition was at first symmetrical along an east-west axis through the centre of the building, though this arrangement was later altered by the addition of new wings; this is clad in brick, trimmed with cut stone and ornate wood cornices at the roof line, and iron cresting tops the tower. The overall design was described in 1883 as "Italian, modified to suit the requirements of the climate," though the same year an early visitor noted in the guest book: "It is an unpretending looking structure, of nondescript architecture and with no outside ornamentation." Similarly, in 1953, the provincial architect said that Government House was the one "jarring note" on the grounds of the Legislative Building. By later in the 20th century, however, provincial architects stated the house is "Victorian architecture with French influence from the Second Napoleonic Empire with the flat steep-sided Mansard roof".

When first built, the ground floor of Government House held a suite of interconnected rooms that, opened to one another, formed a suite 29 metres (95 ft) long and 6.1 metres (20 ft) wide. Altogether, these included, in a counter-clockwise array around the central stair hall, the library, immediately to the right of the foyer, the breakfast room, the drawing room, the dining room, a serving room, and the viceroy's office at the left of the foyer. Later, in 1901, a veranda was built around the north-east corner of the house, and a ballroom was added to the rear, both at the personal expense of Lieutenant Governor Daniel Hunter McMillan. Then, in 1908, the front porch was enclosed in a robust structure and a palm room and adjoining conservatory were added off the dining room. Until 1946, the kitchens were in the basement and serving took place via a dumbwaiter; that year a new kitchen was built into another extension off the rear of the mansion. Eventually what had been the palm room was made into an extension of the dining room and, in 1953, the original serving room was sacrificed in favour of a cloak room and powder room, as well as an elevator in place of the dumbwaiter. The ballroom was demolished in 1960 to make way for the current assembly room, which was, for catering purposes, linked to the kitchen by a new serving room, and three years following, the conservatory was pulled down and replaced with a new sun room, potting room, and greenhouse, as well as a three car garage. Today, the lieutenant governor's office has been moved to the Legislative Building and the room it once occupied made into a sitting room for the viceroy's aides-de-camp. The former library, breakfast room, and drawing room have all been turned into a series of connected salons for official entertaining.

Reached by a staircase of oak treads, newels, balusters, and handrail with pine risers, the second floor consisted in 1880 of six bedrooms, two dressing rooms, a bath room, a toilet, and a storage closet. Two of the bedrooms were connected by large sliding doors, as with the library and breakfast room beneath; during large parties, these doors would be pulled back and the combined bedrooms would be used for expanded entertainment space. Over time, the spaces on this level were altered and some of the bedrooms were divided into private en suite bathrooms. The royal bedroom is reserved for use by the sovereign and other Royal Family members when they are in Winnipeg, and the gold room accommodates royal support staff or other royals if the monarch is occupying the royal bedroom. Also on this floor is the viceregal suite, consisting of a master bedroom, the lieutenant governor's private office, and a library and living room.

The basement of Government House is divided into several sections; originally it held living quarters for the domestic staff—a kitchen and bedrooms—as well as the main kitchen for the state dining room on the ground floor. Currently, it contains storage and laundry facilities. The attic floor was divided into nine bedrooms, which has been reduced to four bedrooms with the addition of two bathrooms, a sitting room, and a three and one-half room suite for the resident housekeeper. From this floor one can also access the tower, from which the lieutenant governor's standard is flown when he or she is in residence.

== Grounds ==
Manitoba's Government House is surrounded on three sides by manicured gardens; the fourth side—the rear of the building—faces directly onto the parking lot of the Legislative Building. In 2010, part of the grounds were set aside and dedicated as the Queen Elizabeth II Gardens by the Queen herself on 3 July that year, the event marked by the planting of an Amber Jubilee Ninebark shrub, the species having been created specifically for Elizabeth II's Diamond Jubilee in 2012. At the same time, a statue of the Queen that had been created in 1970 by Leo Mol and installed outside the Manitoba Centennial Centre was moved to the eponymous gardens and unveiled by her. The statue was toppled over on 1 July 2021 in a protest against Canada Day. It was later repaired and reinstalled in the gardens.

== See also ==
- Government Houses in Canada
- Government Houses of the British Empire
