= Dorothy Burroughes =

English painter (1883–1963)

- Born: Dorothy Mary L. Burroughes; 1883; London, England
- Died: 1963 (aged 79–80)
- Education: Slade School of Art; Heatherley School of Fine Art
- Known for: Illustrations, printmaking

Dorothy Mary L. Burroughes (1883 – 18 July 1963) was a British artist known as a painter, illustrator and linocut artist. She designed posters and wrote and illustrated a series of children's books.

== Biography ==
Burroughes was born and lived most of her life in London, although in her later years she lived near Henley-on-Thames. She studied at the Slade School of Art and at Heatherley's in London before furthering her studies in Germany. Burroughes produced illustrations for a number of magazines including Bystander, Sketch and the Illustrated London News. She produced posters for the London Underground, including the poster For the Zoo in the style of a Japanese colour woodcut. Throughout the 1930s and into the 1940s she wrote and illustrated a series of children's books, often on animal themes. Animals were also a recurring theme in the prints she produced as were cloud formations. Her prints often featured towering banks of cumulus clouds above an English landscape. Burroughes also illustrated books by other writers, notably The Story of the Red Deer which was published by Gregynog Press in 1936 and for which she produced eleven colour prints.

Throughout the 1920s Burroughes lived with her partner Vere Hutchinson, an author who had five books published but died in 1931 after a protracted illness. Burroughes was elected a member of the Society of Women Artists in 1923 and became a member of the Royal Society of British Artists in 1925. She exhibited with the Fine Art Society in London and both the London Transport Museum and the Victoria & Albert Museum hold examples of her work.

== Books illustrated ==
Books illustrated by Burroughes include,

- Queer Beasts at the Zoo by G Davidson, Allen & Unwin, 1927
- Queer Birds at the Zoo by G Davidson, Allen & Unwin, 1927
- Gun Fodder by J. F. Snook, Allen & Unwin, 1930
- The Animal Lovers' Calendar, by Jenkins, 1930
- Fifty-One New Nursery Rhymes by Rose Fyleman, Methuen, 1931
- Tinkle the Cat by NC James, Dent, 1932
- Gardener's Frenzy by M Pallister, Methuen, 1933
- The Story of the Red-Deer by JW Fortescue, Gregynog Press, 1936

== Books written and illustrated ==
Books written and illustrated by Burroughes include,

- The Amazing Adventures of Little Brown Bear, Methuen, 1930
- Jack Rabbit, Detective, Methuen, 1931
- Journeyings of Selina Squirrel and her Friends, Methuen, 1931
- The Odd Little Girl, Methuen, 1932
- Captain Seal's Treasure Hunt, Bodley Head, 1933
- More Adventures of the Odd Little Girl, Bodley Head, 1933
- Harris the Hare and His Own True Love, Bodley Head, 1933
- The Strange Adventures of Mary Jane Stubbs, Bodley Head, 1933
- The House the Moles Built, Hutchinson, 1939
- The Little Black Rabbit, Hutchinson, 1940
- Teddy, the Little Refuge Mouse, Hutchinson, 1942
- The Pigs who Sailed Away, Hutchinson, 1944
- The Magic Herb, Hutchinson, 1945
- The Conceited Frog, Hutchinson, 1949
- The Little White Elephant, Hutchinson, 1953
