= Hilda T. Miller =

British illustrator and painter

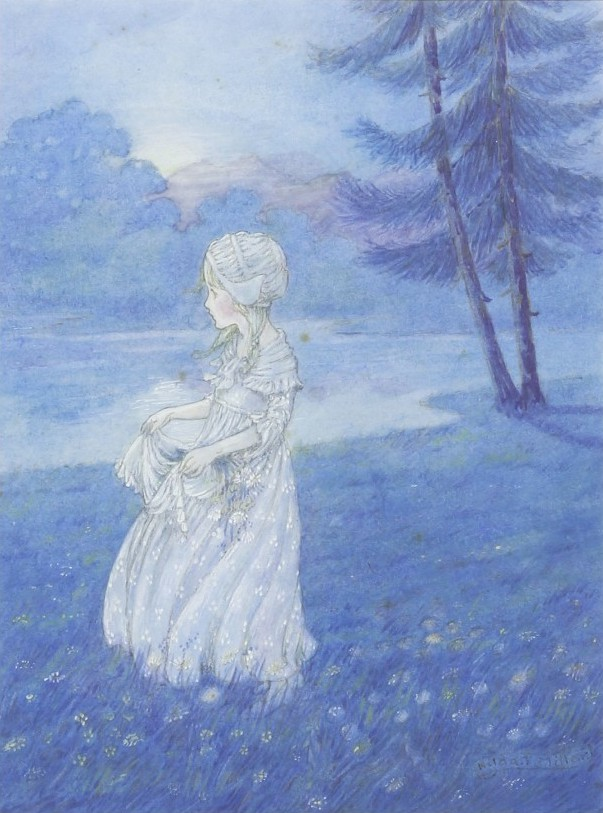
Cover illustration for Lucy (1927), written by Walter de la Mare

Hilda Theodora Miller (née Baker; 1877–1939) was a British illustrator and painter most active in the 1920s. She worked on children's books and fairy tales, as well as postcards and advertisements.

== Biography ==
Hilda Theodora Baker was born in Edgbaston in Birmingham, where she also grew up. The baptism records for the Birmingham Church of England Parish Registers lists her date of birth as 13 January 1877. Her father was John Howard Baker and her mother was Lydia Baker. She may have had brothers named Phillip and Rupert Baker.

She was deaf, and was artistic at young age. She went to the Birmingham School of Art. After, she studied at the Slade School in London before her family moved to Harpenden in Hertfordshire. She then switched her studies to be at the St. Albans School of Art. She met Andrew Miller, who worked at a woolen mill, and they later married in 1907.

Miller was most active in her career in the 1920s. She was a painter and illustrator, mainly of children's books and fairy tales. She also illustrated paper goods, such as greeting cards and calendars. She used watercolour and ink for her artwork. Miller illustrated various goods, including advertisements, books, and post cards, for the publishing companies C. W. Faulker, Duckworth, Liberty & Co, Methuen Publishing, and Thornton Butterworth. She exhibited her art at the Royal Scottish Academy, the Royal Academy, and the Society of Women Artists.

Miller died on 29 March 1939 at a nursing home in Worthing, at the age of 62.

== Gallery ==
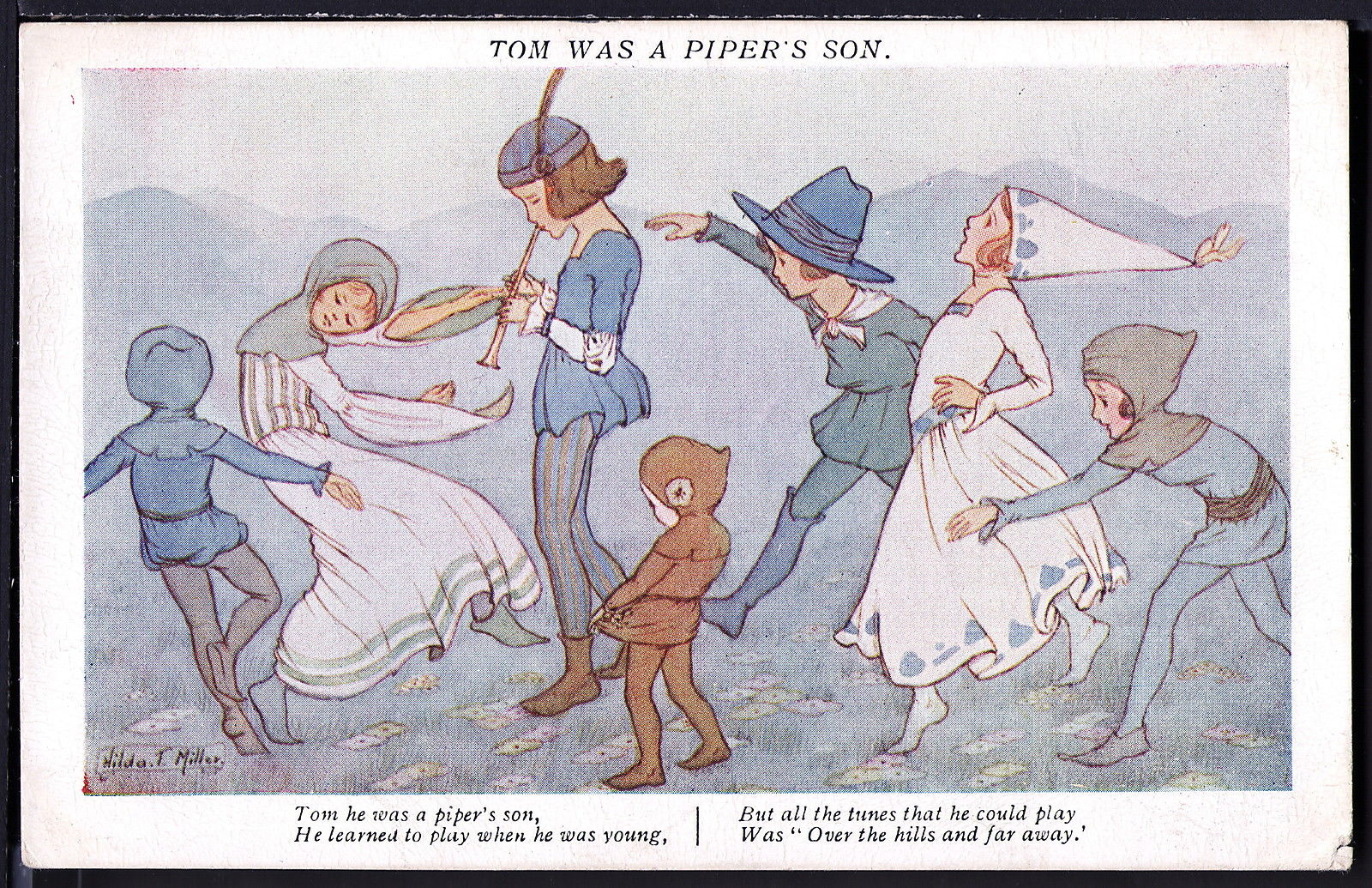
1921 postcard of nursery rhyme "Tom, Tom, the Piper's Son"

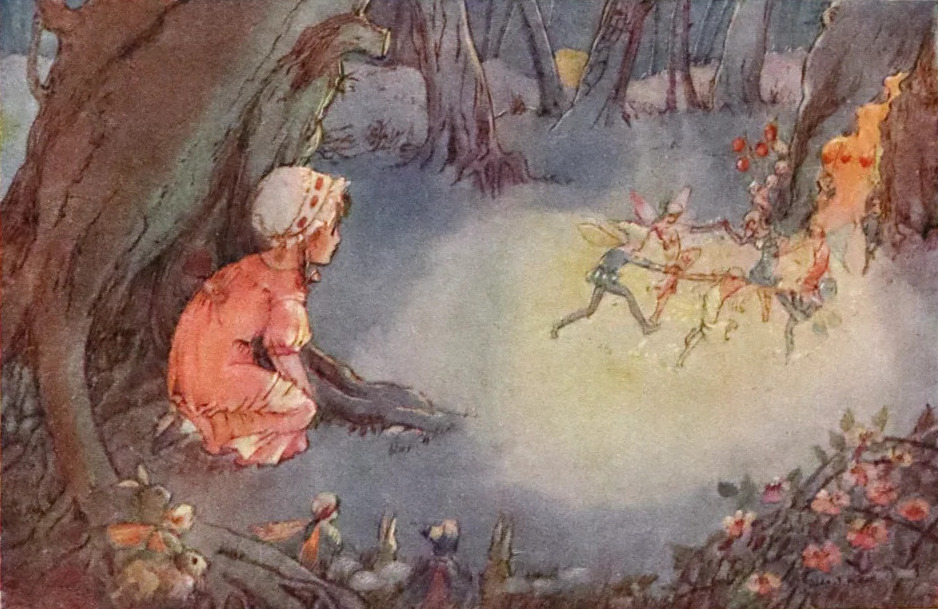
Book illustration by Hilda T. Miller from Dulcibella and the Fairies (c. 1922)

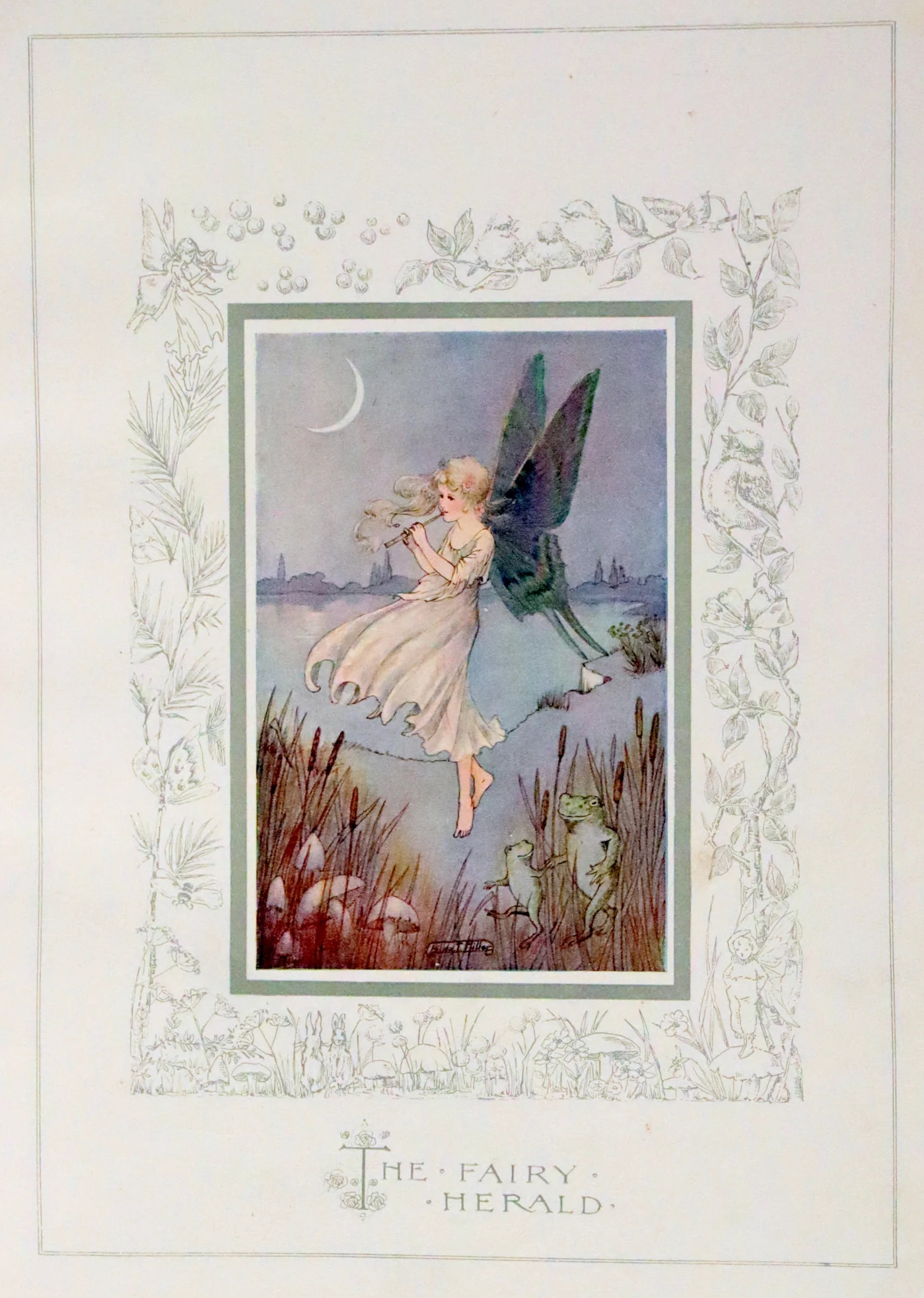
Illustrated book page from Dulcibella and the Fairies (c. 1922) by Miller

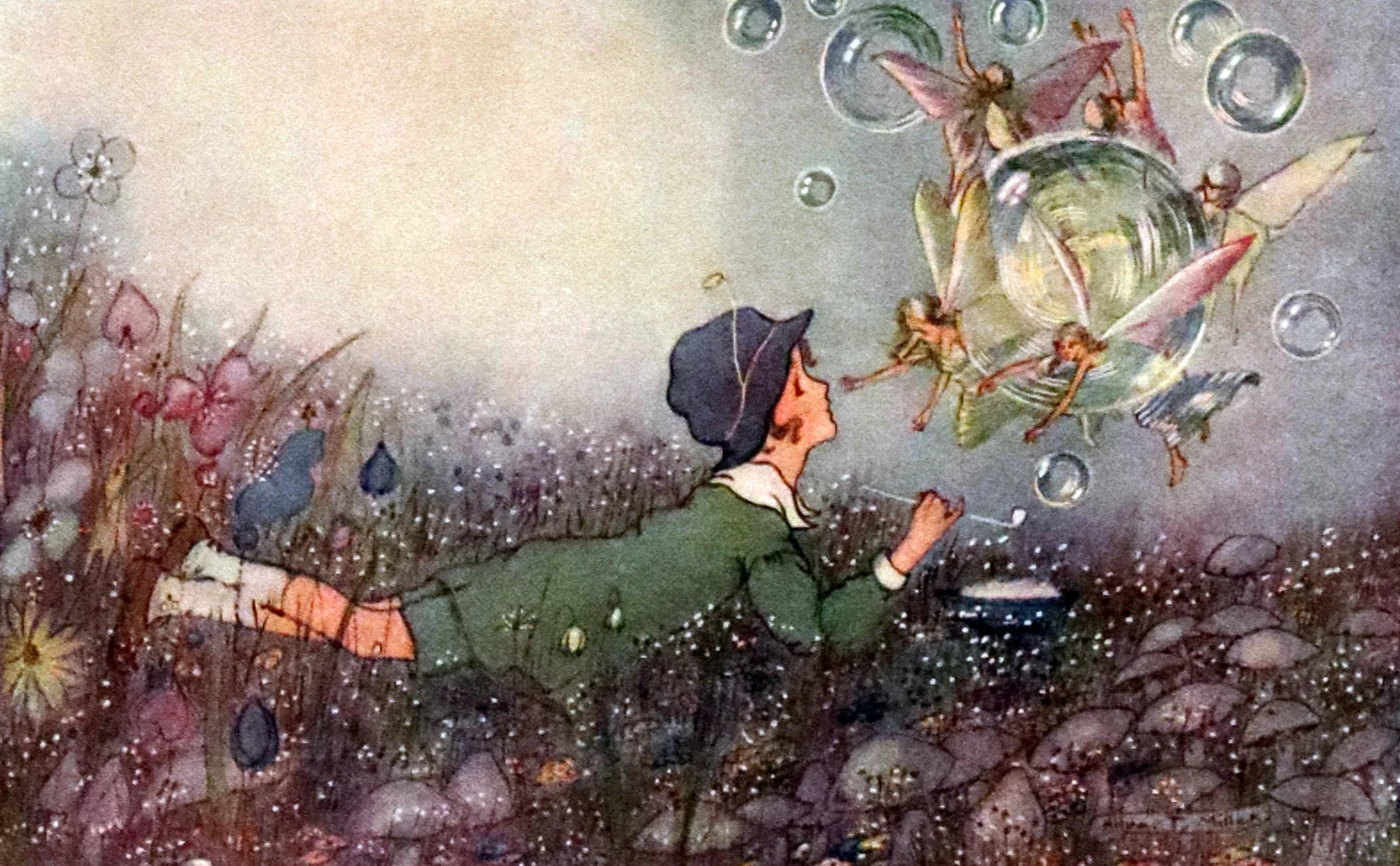
Book illustration by Hilda T. Miller from Dulcibella and the Fairies (c. 1922)

== Illustrated works ==
- Shoes: A Story for Children (c. 1920), by J. A. Bentham
- Dulcibella and the Faries (c. 1922), by Alice M. Rinker
- The Butterflies' Day (1922), by W. H. Koebel
- The Pageant of Flowers (1922), by W. H. Koebel, co-illustrated by Lilian A. Govey
- The Rose Fyleman Fairy Book (1923), by Rose Fyleman
- Fairies and Chimneys, by Rose Fyleman
- Lucy (1920s), by Walter De La Mare
