= Manitoba Day =

- Observed by: Manitoba
- Type: Provincial holiday
- Significance: Celebrating the founding of Manitoba
- Date: May 12
- Frequency: Annual

Manitoba Day (French: Fête du Manitoba) is the official anniversary of the founding of Manitoba, Canada, and is celebrated annually on May 12.

The province of Manitoba was created by The Manitoba Act, which received royal assent on May 12, 1870, and was officially incorporated into Confederation on July 15 that year—the only to enter Confederation under Indigenous leadership (that of Louis Riel). Nearly a century later, Manitoba's official flag was dedicated and raised for the first time on May 12, 1966. Celebrations on May 12 began to grow into an annual community event since the province's centenary in 1970. Because of the double importance of May 12 in the history of the province, the Government of Manitoba designated it as Manitoba Day in 1986.

Despite the official government celebrations, a 2009 survey by Prairie Research found that less than 4% of people surveyed were aware of the importance of May 12 in the province's history. It is also not considered a statutory holiday (or general holiday) and does not mean that Manitobans have the day off work or school.

May 12, 2020, marked the 150th anniversary of Manitoba's founding; accordingly, commemorative events, activities, projects, initiatives, and so on were planned to take place throughout 2020 under the banner of Manitoba 150 (#MB150).

== Events ==
Manitoba Day 2010 represented the province's 140th "birthday", and was officially celebrated in Neepawa, Manitoba. A substitute Manitoba Day was celebrated in Vancouver during the 2010 Winter Olympics on February 25, 2010.

May 12, 2020, marked the 150th anniversary of Manitoba's founding; accordingly, commemorative events, activities, projects, initiatives, and so on were planned to take place throughout 2020 under the banner of Manitoba 150 (#MB150), facilitated by the Manitoba 150 Host Committee with funding from the provincial government. Due to the COVID-19 pandemic, the Manitoba government announced that all Manitoba 150-initiated events were to be paused until 2021; celebrations have since continued into 2021, either virtually or with appropriate measures in place.

The Association for Manitoba Archives presents Manitoba Day Awards yearly in celebration of the occasion.
