= Statue of Queen Victoria (Winnipeg) =

Public sculpture by George Frampton

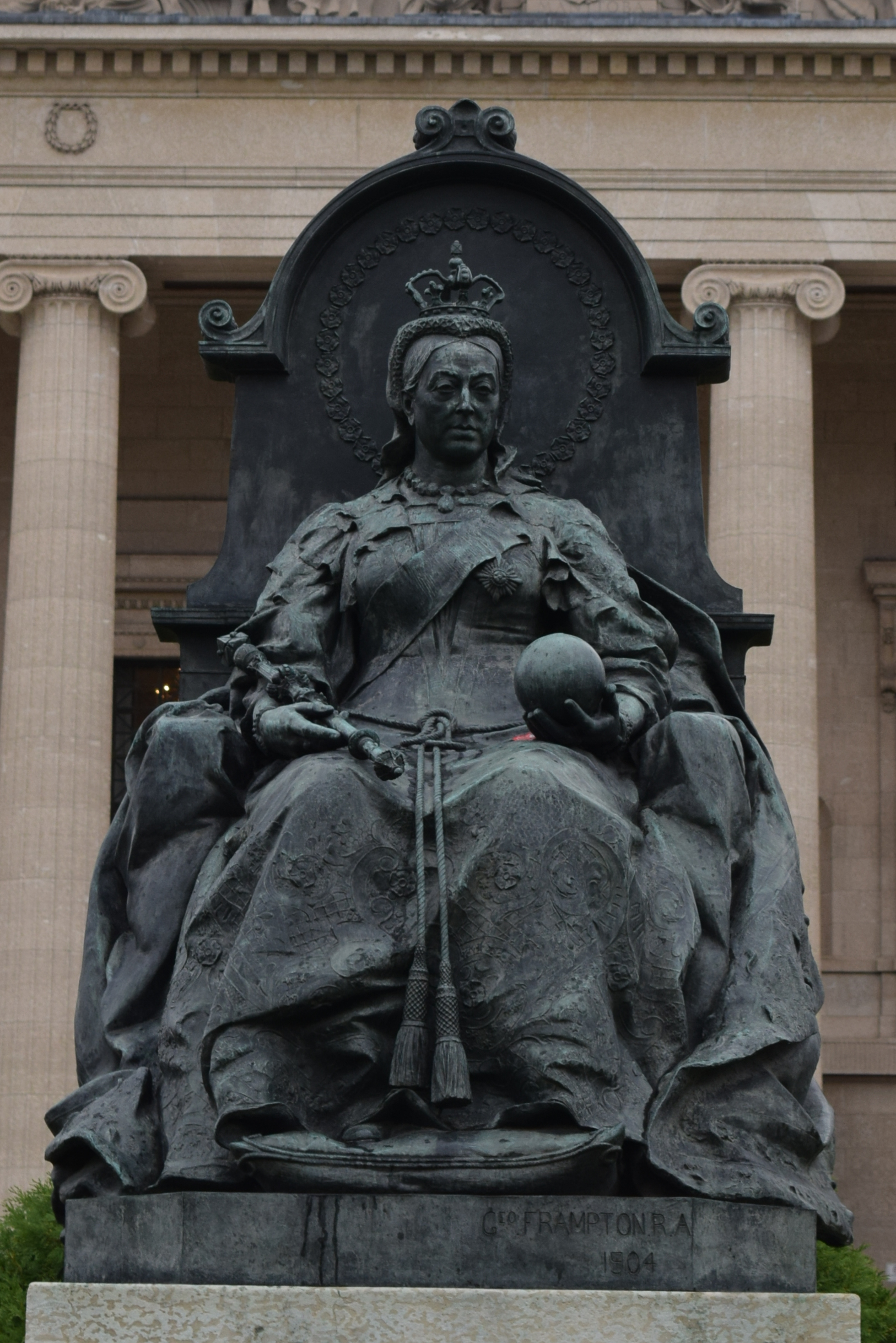
- The former statue of Queen Victoria, with the Manitoba Legislative Building behind.
- Artist: George Frampton
- Year: 1904
- Completion date: 1 October 1904
- Subject: Queen Victoria
- Condition: Destroyed (2021)
- Location: Manitoba Legislative Building, Winnipeg, Manitoba, Canada; 49.88535°N 97.14734°W

A statue of Queen Victoria formerly stood on the grounds of the Manitoba Legislative Building in Winnipeg, Manitoba, Canada.

The monument was designed by British sculptor George Frampton, cost $15,000, and was paid for by a mixture of public funds and private donations. Unveiled on 1 October 1904 by Sir Rodmond Roblin, the statue showed the Queen seated on a throne with the royal sceptre in her right hand and the orb in her left hand. Frampton used the same model in two other statues, one in St Helens, Merseyside, and the other in Leeds, West Yorkshire, both in England.

During the night of 23 June 2020, the statue was vandalized with red and white paint, amid a wave of anti-racism protests. The statue was then toppled and covered in paint on 1 July 2021, Canada Day, during a protest denouncing the deaths of Indigenous children in Canadian residential schools. The head, crown, and orb were removed by protesters overnight; the head was later recovered, without its crown, from the Assiniboine River. The statue was deemed unrepairable and the provincial government stated that it would not be replaced.

During demolition of the vacant plinth, a broken bottle and message were discovered within. Hand-written on a typed list of dignitaries at the dedication of the monument on 30 July 1921 are the words, "on account of the prohibition, we are unable to adhere to the custom of depositing a bottle of brandy under the stone, for which we are extremely sorry". This was signed by a stonecutter. The provincial cabinet plans to preserve the document and to determine what to do with it.

== See also ==
- Royal monuments in Canada
- Monarchy of Canada § Public perception and understanding
