= History of monarchy in Canada =

The history of monarchy in Canada stretches from pre-colonial times through to the present day. The date monarchy was established in Canada varies; some sources say it was when the French colony of New France was founded in the name of King Francis I in 1534, while others state it was in 1497, when John Cabot made landfall in what is thought to be modern day Newfoundland or Nova Scotia, making a claim in the name of King Henry VII. Europeans in the 16th and 17th centuries often considered the territories belonging to different aboriginal groups to be kingdoms. Nevertheless, the present Canadian monarchy can trace itself back to the Anglo-Saxon period and ultimately to the kings of the Angles and the early Scottish kings; monarchs reigning over Canada have included those of France (to King Louis XV in 1763), those of the United Kingdom (to King George V in 1931), and those of Canada (to King Charles III as King of Canada today). Canadian historian Father Jacques Monet said of Canada's Crown, "[it is] one of an approximate half-dozen that have survived through uninterrupted inheritance from beginnings that are older than our Canadian institution itself."

Canada's first European monarchs instigated, funded, and supported the exploration and settlement of the country. After the Glorious Revolution in 1689, the sovereigns had their powers constrained by the tenets of constitutional monarchy and responsible government, thereby having less, and then no say in colonization, or policy, in general, the Crown coming to function as the guarantor of Canada's continuous and stable governance and as a nonpartisan safeguard against the abuse of power. Concurrent with constitutional developments, the Canadian colonies of France were, via war and treaties through the 18th century, ceded to King George III; four colonies were confederated by Queen Victoria in 1867 to form the Dominion of Canada, with other colonies and territories joining over the decades up to 1949; and Canada became a fully independent kingdom through the Statute of Westminster, 1931—enacted by King George V—and then the Constitution Act of 1982—brought into force by Elizabeth II, the Queen of Canada.

== Pre-colonial ==
While no indigenous North Americans in what is now Canada had what would be seen today as an official monarchy, some aboriginal peoples, before their first encounters with French and British colonisers, were governmentally organised in a fashion similar to the occidental idea of monarchy. Europeans often considered territories belonging to different aboriginal groups to be kingdoms—such as along the north shore of the St Lawrence River, between the Trinity River and the Isle-aux-Coudres, and the neighbouring kingdom of Canada, which stretched west to the Island of Montreal—and the leaders of these communities were referred to as kings, particularly those chosen through heredity. Many had chieftains, whose powers varied from one nation to the next; in some instances, the chief would exercise considerable authority and influence on the decisions of the group, while, in others, he was more of a symbolic or ceremonial figure. In the latter cases, considering that many First Nations societies were governed by unwritten customs and codes of conduct, wherein the chieftain was bound to follow the advice of a council of elders, the form of government would have closely resembled a modern constitutional monarchy.

Hereditary chieftainship continues today; though, the chiefs are not sovereign and only have jurisdiction over traditional territories that fall outside of band-controlled reservation land; on reservation land, it is "up to the community's tolerance, or its politics, on how much [the hereditary chiefs are] involved in governance." The hereditary chiefs often serve as knowledge-keepers, responsible for the upholding of a First Nation's traditional customs, legal systems, and cultural practices.

== Establishment of European colonies ==
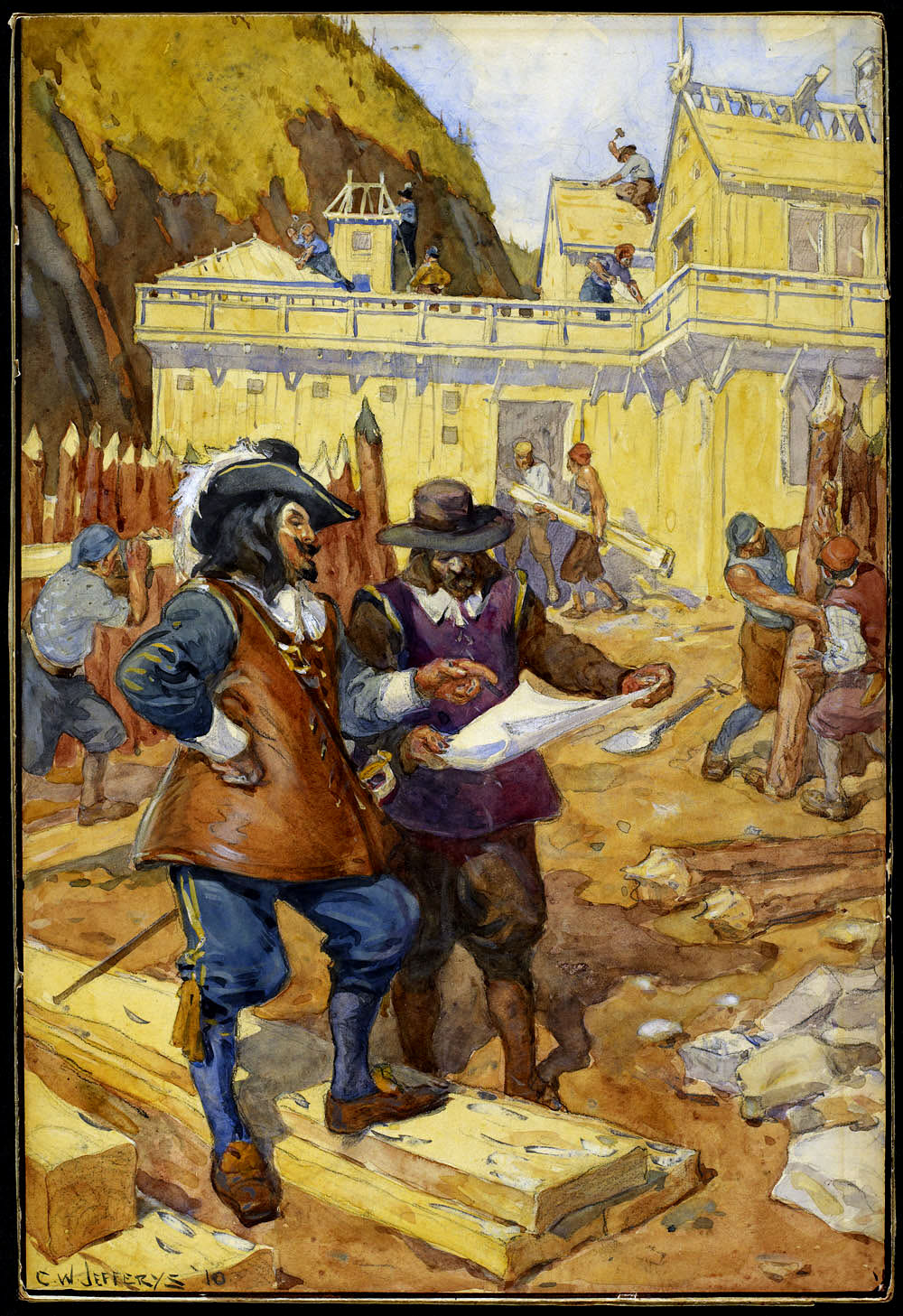
Samuel de Champlain, who was later named as New France's viceregal representative, directing the construction for Quebec City, 1609

The royal standard of France, commonly used in New France from 1589 to 1763 and now charged in the fourth quarter of the escutcheon of the modern royal coat of arms of Canada

The first French colonies in North America were established in the name of King Henry IV, one at Acadia (today Nova Scotia), founded three years into the 17th century, and the second at Port Royal, named to honour Henry. By 1610, the first British settlements were established on Newfoundland, which had been claimed in 1583 for Queen Elizabeth I. The following year, Henry Hudson embarked on the first trading voyage that led to the formation of the Hudson's Bay Company by royal charter from King Charles II; with it, the King claimed an area that covered what is now Alberta, Saskatchewan, Manitoba, Ontario, Minnesota, North Dakota, and more and called the area Rupert's Land, after Prince Rupert, who helped to form the HBC.

The French monarch also moved quickly and it was in 1602 that Aymar de Chaste was appointed as Viceroy of Canada to represent King Henry IV. In 1615, Quebec City was, on the recommendation of Samuel de Champlain, made a royal capital of the French empire in the Americas, with Champlain—who had previously been representative of, or lieutenant governor to, most viceroys of Canada—installed as the first viceregal representative of the King in New France.

Some 60 years later, New France was designated as a royal province of France itself and the governor general acted as the monarch's stand-in. One of the king's decrees was to send the filles du roi (daughters of the King) to the province. As the population expanded, infrastructure such as the chemin du Roi (King's Highway) was built and, through the 18th century, the kings gave financing to the construction of cities like Île-Royale and Louisbourg; the names of these locations reflecting their royal patronage.

As Europeans moved inland, they encountered the aboriginal peoples. Relations with them were originally considered to be between European and North American monarchs; though, for the French, that later changed to be one between sovereign and subject and, for the British, between European and aboriginal nations under one monarch, leading to the incorporation of treaties with the Crown into the political culture of Canada.

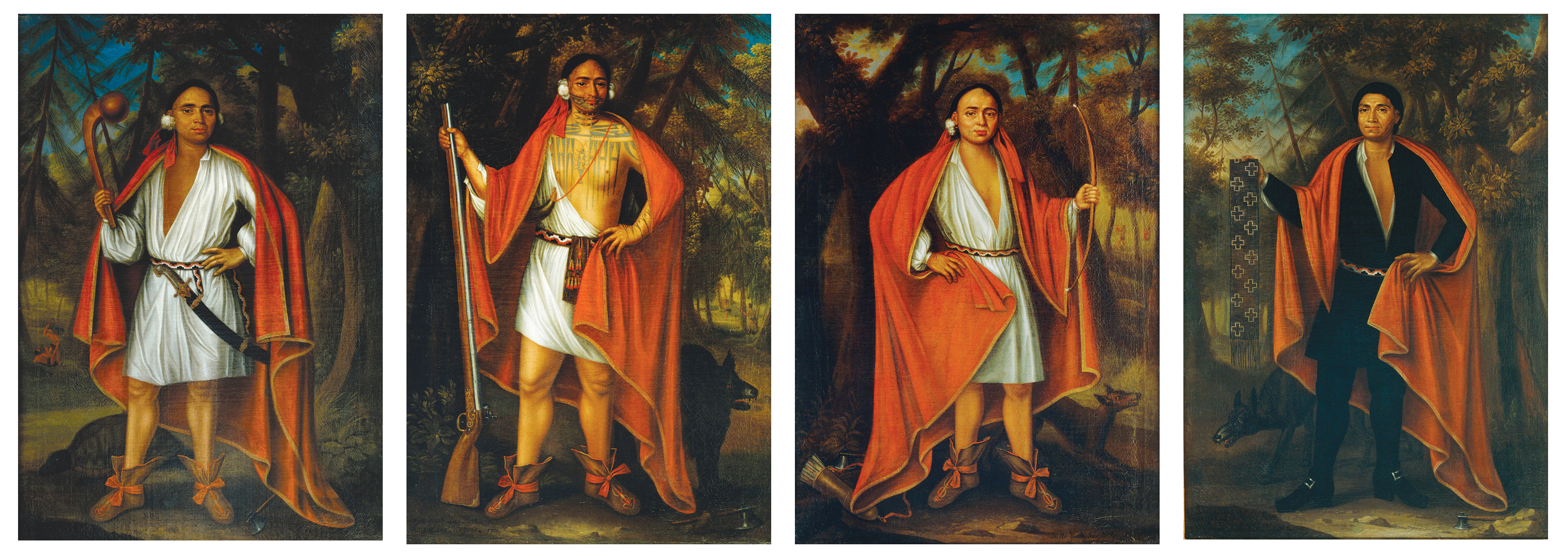
Portraits of the Four Mohawk Kings, painted during their visit with Queen Anne in 1710

Respect between the British sovereign and indigenous chiefs was maintained, exemplified by gestures such as Queen Anne welcoming the "Four Mohawk Kings" at St James's Palace in 1710 and Anne paying for the construction of a chapel for the Mohawks (as they requested) and furnishing it with a reed organ and set of silver chalices (still held by the Mohawk Chapel in Brantford, Ontario) in 1712. Governor Frederick Haldimand, in the name of George III, granted land to the Six Nations of the Grand River after they lost their ancestral territories in what is now the state of New York during the American Revolution.

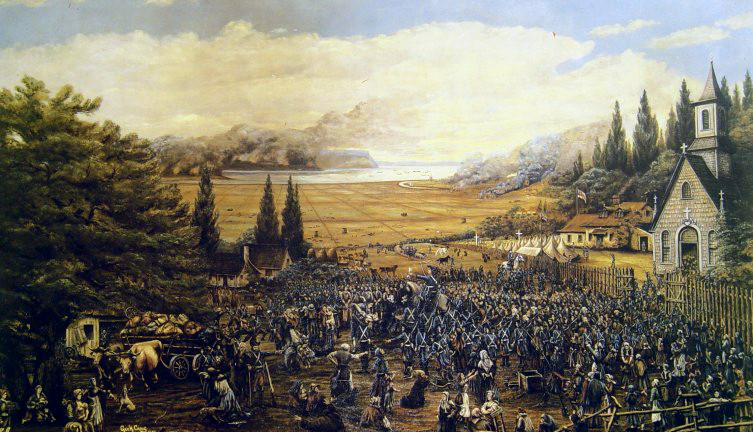
Acadians being deported from Grand-Pré

While the aboriginal chiefs aided the monarchs with their North American conflicts, affairs in Europe would also affect the dealings of the New World and, eventually, almost all of the French king's possessions in what was known as Canada were relinquished by him to the British Crown, providing Canada with one singular monarchy. But, this placement of French people under a British sovereign did not come without friction; the Acadians refused to affirm their allegiance to George III and insisted upon remaining Catholic, leading to their deportation in what became known as the Great Upheaval.

== The American Revolution ==
Following the Treaty of Paris, concluding the Seven Years' War, King George III issued the Royal Proclamation of 1763, setting the Appalachian Mountains as the division between the Thirteen Colonies, to the east, and "Indian Reserve", to the west. Being the first legal recognition by the British Crown of aboriginal rights, the document is today viewed as fundamental for First Nations land claims and self-government in Canada.

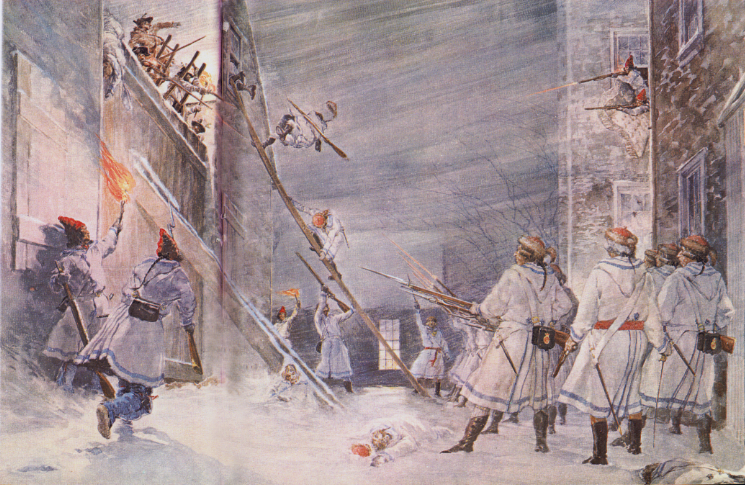
Canadien militiamen, wishing to remain under the Crown, defending Quebec City from attack by American revolutionaries, 31 December 1775

Loyalist refugees on their way to the Canadas during the American Revolution

Loyalists' military coronet (left) and civil coronet (right)

The Quebec Act—shaped by the views of the anti-assimilationist Governor of Quebec, Guy Carlton and supported by King George—was passed in 1774, by which the Crown guaranteed the continued free practice of Catholicism, as well as restored the French system of civil law for issues relating to private law. This originated the tradition of Canadian constitutional law protecting linguistic, religious, and legal rights in Quebec.

The Royal Proclamation and Quebec Act were regarded by American colonists as two of the Intolerable Acts that eventually led to the outbreak of the American Revolution. But, the American hostility toward the spirit of those laws is what led most Québécois to rebuff the revolution; they fought, in provincial militias, alongside British soldiers repelling invasions by the republican revolutionaries. Others, though—especially the peasant habitants—aided the Americans.

The conflict resulted in some 46,000 United Empire Loyalists fleeing north from the United States, the King-in-Council granting each family 200 acres (0.81 km^{2}) of land in his various colonies, mostly in Nova Scotia, but, also in Quebec and what is today Ontario and Manitoba. At the same time, approximately 3,000 former slaves of African ancestry, known as Black Loyalists, moved to the Maritimes and thousands of Iroquois, Mohawks, and other aboriginals expelled from New York and other states resettled under the protection of the Crown in what is now southern Ontario. In all, so many arrived that, for administrative purposes, the colony of New Brunswick was split out of Nova Scotia and Upper Canada (today Ontario) split from the Province of Quebec (the remainder becoming Lower Canada, today Quebec). Since then, Ontario residents descended from these original refugees retain the post-nominals UE, standing for United Empire, and may employ coronets in their coats of arms.

The loyalists who settled in the Maritimes, however, found themselves among some residents aligned with the United States and its republican cause.

== Royalty and rebellions ==
Prince William (later King William IV) arrived in the Canadas in July 1786, on board and in command of HMS Pegasus. The Prince spent time in Newfoundland, Nova Scotia, and the Province of Quebec, being the first member of the royal family to visit the latter and "making Canada's royal family one of the earliest families to call the country its home." Two of William's 10 illegitimate children with Dorothea Jordan eventually lived in Halifax: Mary, in 1830, and Amelia, from 1840 to 1846, while her husband served as Lieutenant Governor of Nova Scotia.

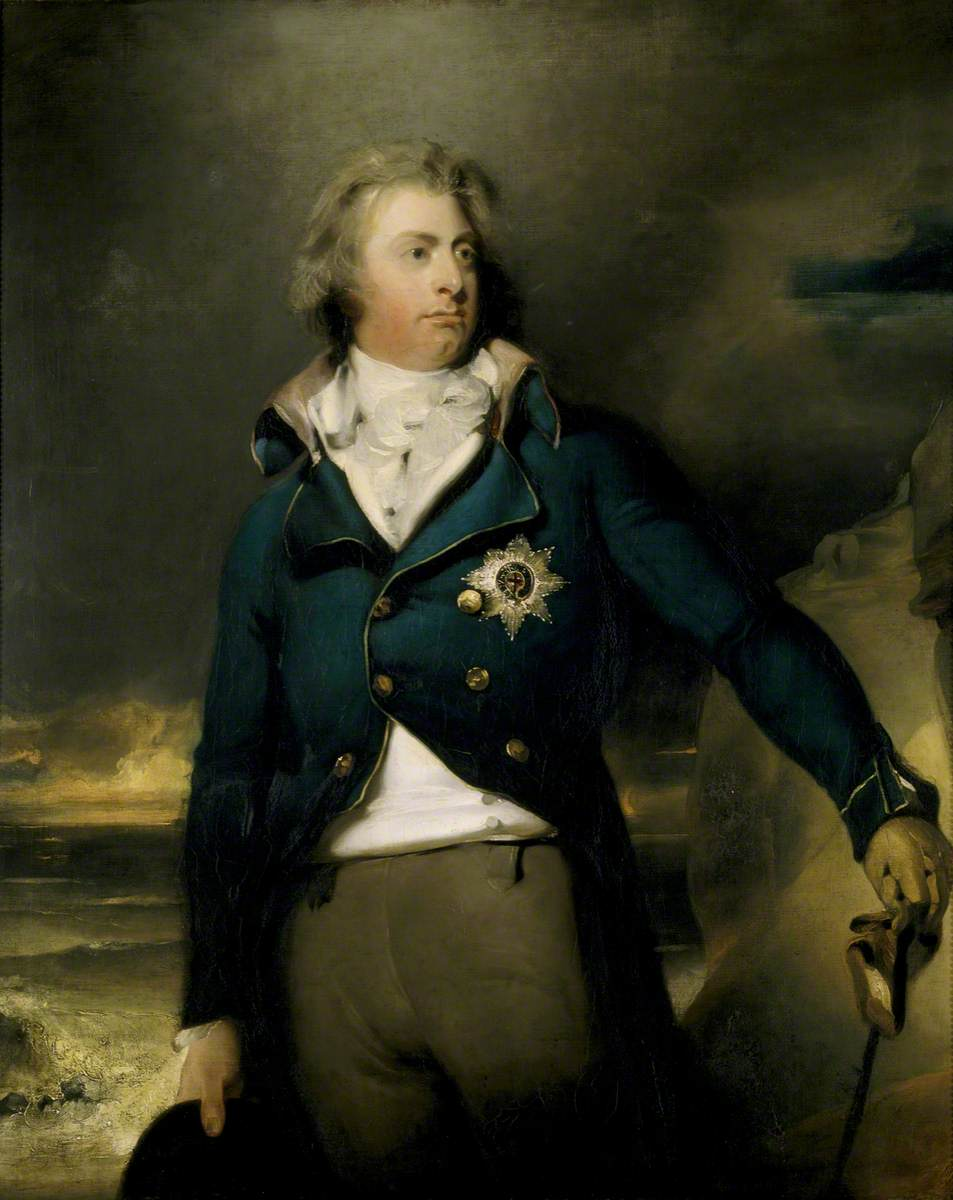
Prince William between 1790 and 1795. The Prince was the first member of the royal family to set foot in the Canadas, in 1786 and 1787

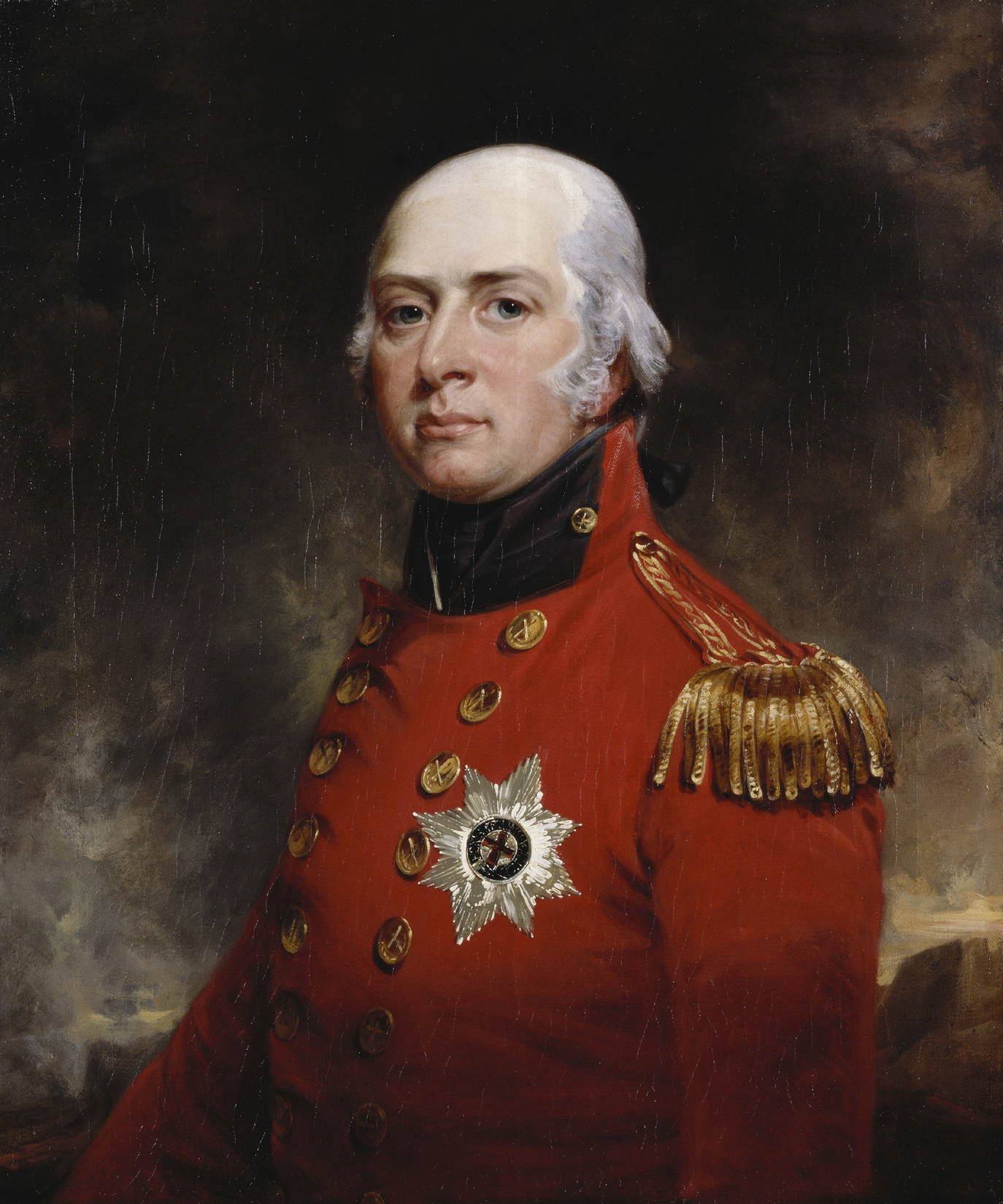
Prince Edward in 1799, with the Star of the Garter, voted to him by the Nova Scotia House of Assembly in 1798. He lived in Quebec and Nova Scotia between 1791 and 1798 and 1799 to 1800.

Four years later, William's brother, Prince Edward, served in Canada from 1791 until the turn of the 19th century on military duties and as Commander of British North American troops. The Prince lived at Quebec City and took a French-Canadian mistress, with whom it is speculated he had two children. In 1792, when a riot, fuelled by ethnic character, broke out at a poll during the first elections for the Legislative Assembly of Lower Canada, Prince Edward said to the crowd, "part then in peace. I urge you to unanimity and accord. Let me hear no more of the odious distinctions of English and French. You are all His Britannic Majesty's beloved Canadian subjects." It was reportedly the first time the word Canadian was used to refer to all colonists, rather than only Francophones.

Edward also lived in Halifax, Nova Scotia, between 1794 and 1798 and, again, from 1799 to 1800, making a significant mark on the city through projects such as Fort George, the Halifax Town Clock, the Prince's Lodge, and St George's Church, (Note: In a retrospective article published on the death of Fleiger's daughter in 1890, she is reported to have recalled events that occurred during the life of the Duke of Kent who, she noted, "had a great love of architecture peculiar in form and Mr Fleiger, at his request, designed the plan, or rough sketch, for the Round Church." The Round Church was a reference to St George's Anglican Church in Halifax.) which the King and Edward's brother, Prince Frederick, supported. Edward also initiated construction of fortifications on Prince Edward Island, which was named in his honour. In 1811, Edward sought to obtain the appointment as governor general of the Canadas, although failed to do so.

The Americans once again attempted to conquer the Canadas in the War of 1812, assuming Canadians would greet them as liberators from the British Crown's "tyranny". While the many Americans who had previously immigrated to Upper and Lower Canada to take advantage of the free land remained neutral, the free-African-, other English-, and French-Canadians, as well as First Nations warriors, resisted every incursion attempted by US troops, fighting off the "immoral and excessively democratic American republic." By the time the Treaty of Ghent was signed on 24 December 1814, ending the war, the United States made no gains into the Canadas.

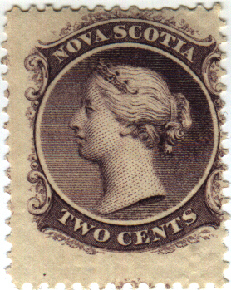
A two-cent stamp from the colony of Nova Scotia, printed in 1863, showing the effigy of a young Queen Victoria

Prince Edward's only legitimate daughter, Victoria, was born on 24 May 1819, at Kensington Palace. However, Edward died shortly thereafter, leaving Victoria as heir to the throne until, upon the death of her uncle, William IV, she acceded as queen at the age of 18. Though she would never visit Canada, she received numerous Canadians in audience (especially her father's friends) and her image, thanks to the spread of newspapers and the invention of photography, was reproduced sufficiently to maintain popularity and loyalty in her colonies.

Insurrections against the Crown did still take place, though; notably the Rebellions of 1837, which had been stirred up, in part, by the rise in power and influence of the United States and republican sentiment, as well as local political factors. The Queen took a personal interest in the conflicts, expressing her concerns in her diary. However, most colonists did not espouse a break with the Crown and the rebellions were put down. The leader of the insurrection in Upper Canada, William Lyon Mackenzie, fled and established the briefly-lived Republic of Canada on Navy Island, in the Niagara River.

In the wake of the disturbances, the Queen called on her people in Upper Canada to eschew vengeance on the perpetrators in favour of justice. A mark of her coronation, Victoria granted pardons to the rebels. Further, Victoria requested from her representative, Governor General the Earl of Durham, a report on the protesters' grievances. Though Durham did, in 1838, recommend the assimilation of French-Canadians into British-Canadian culture, that was ignored in favour of the other suggestions: the union of Upper and Lower Canada and the implementation of responsible government. The British Parliament granted both to the Canadas, with the support of Victoria herself, despite its decrease of the political influence in the colonies of both she and her representatives.

== The first royal tours ==
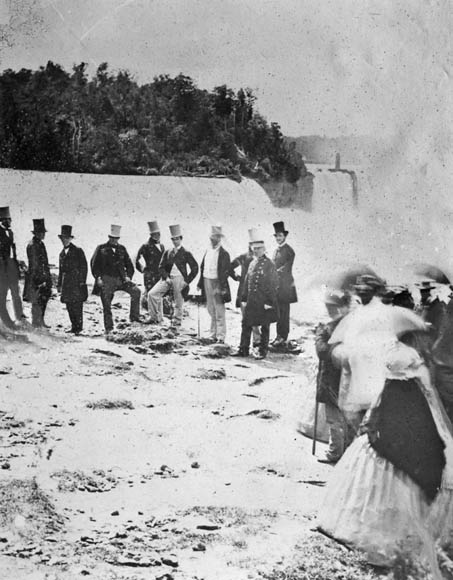
Prince Albert Edward (standing, foot on rock) at the top of Niagara Falls, 1860

Where royal influence was lessened, it increased in other areas; Canadians celebrated momentous moments in Queen Victoria's life, such as her marriage to Prince Albert; royal events were inaugurated, such as the Queen's Plate, created with Queen Victoria's blessing in 1860; and, while she was monarch, Victoria's children and grandchildren would come to Canada as either the governor general or viceregal consort, or to undertake tours of the country that included meeting Canadians from a heterogeneity of communities and backgrounds and displaying local cultures.

In response to a petition from the Legislative Assembly of the Province of Canada, the Queen sent her eldest son and heir, Prince Albert Edward (later King Edward VII) to tour the Maritimes and Canada for four months in 1860, laying the final stone of the Victoria Bridge in Montreal, setting the cornerstone of the parliament building in Bytown (today Ottawa), and officially opening Queen's Park in Toronto. Sectarian tensions were high in Canada at the time, requiring a deft handling of symbolism by the Prince and his handlers.

Albert Edward was followed by his younger brother, Prince Alfred, who embarked on a five-week tour of the same areas the next year.

== Confederation and the early Dominion ==
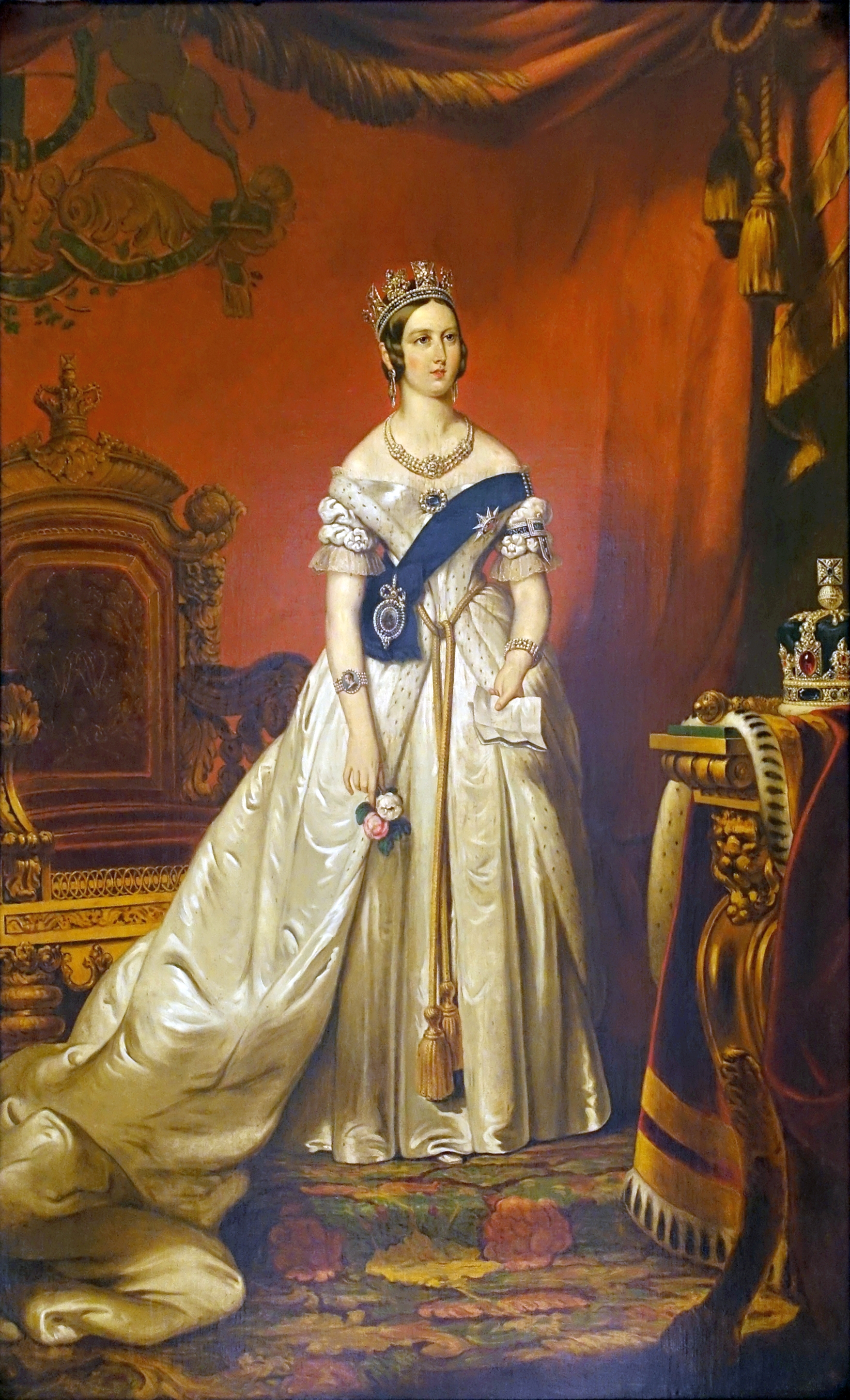
The portrait of Queen Victoria that hangs in Osgoode Hall in Toronto, Ontario; a copy of the John Partridge original that was rescued from four fires, including the burning of the parliament of the Province of Canada in 1849 and the great fire of the Centre Block in 1916

The idea of joining the various colonies in the Canadas was being floated as early as 1814. That year, Chief Justice of Lower Canada Jonathan Sewell sent a copy of his proposal, A Plan for the federal Union of British Provinces in North America, to Prince Edward, who Sewell had befriended when they both lived in Quebec City. The Prince replied, "nothing can be better arranged than the whole thing is, or more perfectly," and made suggestions that were cited by the Earl of Durham in his report in 1838 and in the constitutional conferences of 1864.

Prior to the confederation of Canada, in the 1850s and 1860s, a number of issues were of prime concern in the deliberations on the amalgamation of four Canadian colonies into a country; most notably, the threat of invasion by the United States, especially considering that country's policy of Manifest Destiny. It was the explicit intention of the Fathers of Confederation to unite the disparate British entities in North America into a single state under a constitutional monarchy; at the 1864 Charlottetown Conference, the delegates, including those from Canada East (now Quebec), agreed unanimously that the new federation should have that form of government, the men seeing it as a balance between the autocracy of the Russian Empire and the popular sovereignty of the United States. The latter had just led to the American Civil War, which was seen as "the final stage in the discredit of [American] democracy and republicanism." A Canadian crown, the Fathers thought, would ensure diversity and racial harmony in Canada, thereby strengthening its legal and cultural sovereignty.

The Queen herself was a unifying influence not only for the Fathers, but, for the provinces, as well. She took personal interest in the project of Confederation, favouring the idea as a way to lower the costs of defence and improve relations with the United States. At first, Victoria remarked on "the impossibility of our being able to hold Canada; but, we must struggle for it; and by far the best solution would be to let it go as an independent kingdom under an English prince." Later, though, to the delegates from Nova Scotia to whom Victoria granted an audience, she said, "I take the deepest interest in [Confederation], for I believe it will make [the provinces] great and prosperous." When the British North America Act, 1867, was passed in the Parliament in Westminster, the Queen said to John A. Macdonald, who was then in London, "I am very glad to see you on this mission [...] It is a very important measure and you have all exhibited so much loyalty."

By the mid-1860s, neither the name nor the location of the capital of the hypothetical new union had been settled. On the former issue, various suggestions were put forward—including Victorialand, in honour of the Queen—but John A. Macdonald and then Governor General of the Province of Canada, the Viscount Monk, supported the name Kingdom of Canada, to "fix the monarchical basis of the constitution." The proposal, however, caused worries in the Foreign and Colonial Office in London that such a title would provoke the republican United States and a compromise term, dominion, was adopted instead. This new Dominion was formed by the British North America Act, 1867, to take effect on 1 July of that year. As it was Queen Victoria's royal assent that enacted the bill into law and she had taken such an interest in the endeavour of Confederation, she has since been dubbed the "Mother of Confederation".

The matter of which city would serve as the country's capital was left by the British North America Act, 1867, to be decided by the Queen. From a list that included various well-established cities in Upper and Lower Canada, Victoria chose the small community of Bytown (later renamed as Ottawa) on the grounds that it was defensible, located on a major waterway, and sat on the border between the two largest provinces of Canada, Quebec and Ontario. The buildings originally intended to house the parliament of the Province of Canada were also already in Bytown.

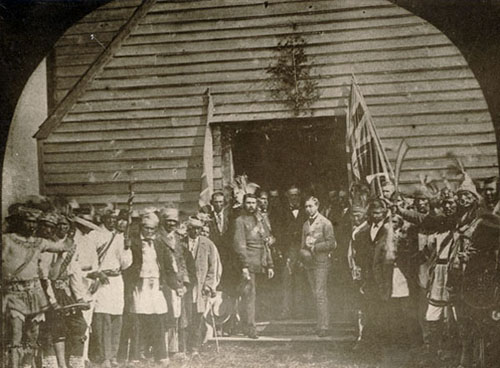
Prince Arthur (in doorway, holding bowler hat) with the Chiefs of the Six Nations at the Mohawk Chapel, in Brantford, Ontario, 1869. The church would be designated as a chapel royal by Arthur's brother, King Edward VII, in 1904.

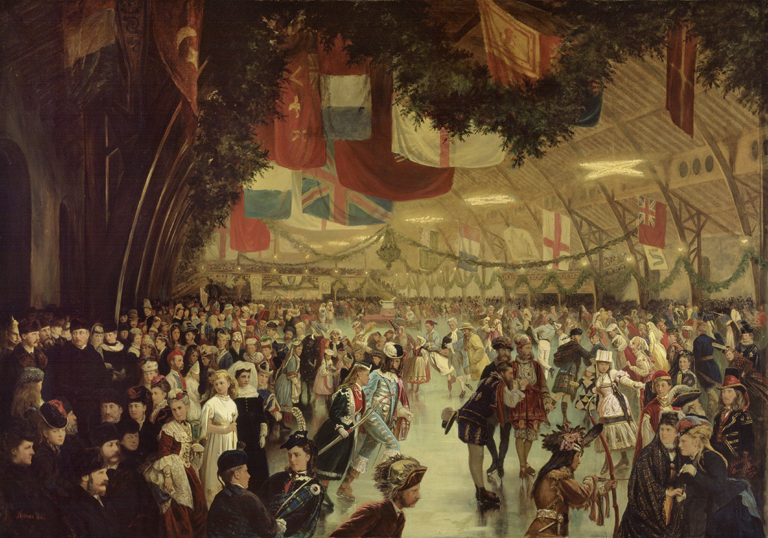
Composite painting depicting the skating party held in honour of Prince Arthur at the Victoria Skating Rink in Montreal, Quebec, 1870

The new constitution vested in the Queen responsibility for peace, order, and good government, as D'Arcy McGee had desired. In practice, though, the Second Reform Act, 1867, and the emergence of a two-party system decreased Victoria's personal room for manoeuvre. Still, the ceremonial role for the monarchy remained unaltered and the first visit of a member of the royal family to the Dominion of Canada took place two years after its creation; the sovereign's second son, Prince Arthur, arrived for training with the Rifle Brigade based at Montreal. Arthur toured the country for eight weeks, was made a chief by the Iroquois of the Grand River Reserve, and, in 1870, attended a fancy-dress skating carnival at Victoria Skating Rink in Montreal. Of the Prince, Lady Lisgar, wife of then Governor General of Canada the Lord Lisgar, noted in a letter to Victoria that Canadians seemed hopeful Prince Arthur would one day return as governor general.

In the same year, Rupert's Land was ceded to the Crown in Right of Canada from the Hudson's Bay Company, pulling it into the jurisdiction of the North-West Territories. This move sparked a Métis rebellion and the establishment by Louis Riel of a provisional republican government in the Red River Valley. Following negotiations with Riel's administration, the province of Manitoba was established in 1870 by the granting of royal assent to the Manitoba Act by Governor General the Earl of Dufferin.

== A royal viceregal consort ==
After the death of her husband, Prince Albert, in 1861, Queen Victoria had gone into deep mourning and retreated from public life. As that situation carried on for over a decade, resentment toward the Queen grew in Britain, along with republican sentiment. But, because Victoria had never visited Canada, and therefore Canadians did not perceive of any change in her behaviour, the Queen's popularity remained high throughout the country. John Charles Dent wrote in 1880, "In Canada, loyalty has by no means degenerated into a mere feeble sentiment of expediency. Throughout the length and breadth of our land, the name of Queen Victoria is regarded with an affectionate love and veneration which is felt for no other human being." In 1872, Canada celebrated a day of thanksgiving after Prince Albert Edward recovered from a near-fatal bout of typhoid.

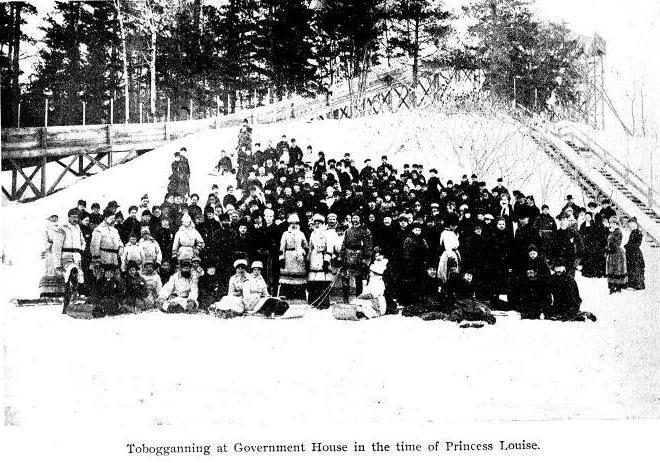
Princess Louise and Governor General John Campbell, Marquess of Lorne, hosting a tobogganning party on the grounds of Rideau Hall, in Ottawa, 1878

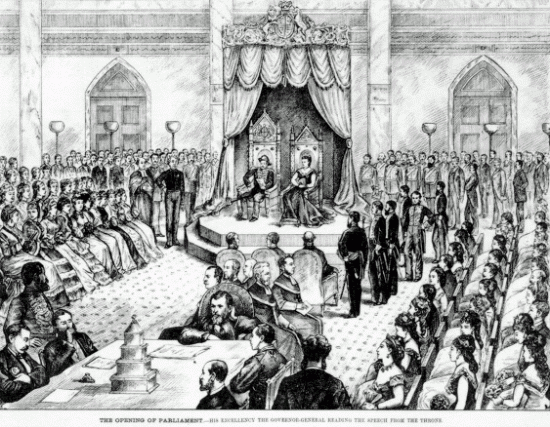
Princess Louise accompanies Governor General John Campbell, Marquess of Lorne, for the opening of the 4th Canadian Parliament, 13 February 1879

As successor to Dufferin, rather than sending Prince Arthur to Canada as her representative, Queen Victoria, on the advice of her British Privy Council, appointed her son-in-law, John Campbell, Marquess of Lorne, in 1878. This meant that, for the first time, Rideau Hall would have a permanent royal resident: Victoria's fourth daughter, Princess Louise. When the news reached Canada that a daughter of the Queen would be viceregal consort of Canada, a "thrill of joy burst upon the Dominion"; it was felt the Princess would be a strong link between Canadians and their sovereign.

However, the couple were initially not received well by the Canadian press, which complained about the imposition of royalty on the country's hitherto un-regal society, something that was only exasperated by mishaps and misunderstandings and the resulting negative press horrified the Princess. Louise endeared herself by making clear she had no pretenses and, eventually, the worries about a rigid court at the Queen's Canadian residence turned out to be unfounded; the royal couple were found to be more relaxed than their predecessors, as demonstrated at the many Ice skating and tobogganing parties, balls, dinners, and other state occasions hosted by Lord Lorne and Princess Louise.

The pair also undertook extensive tours of the country; some with other members of the royal family, such as when the Princess' younger brother, Prince Leopold, visited and spent time with Louise and the Governor General at their cabin on the Gaspé Peninsula and Louise's nephew, Prince George (later King George V) travelled with the Lornes in 1883 to Ottawa, Toronto, and Niagara Falls. The royal couples' three-month visit to British Columbia in 1882 did much to reconcile the local inhabitants to Confederation. The Princess proved so popular that, when the Governor General announced that the route of the awaited transcontinental railway would pass through Kicking Horse Pass into what has since become Vancouver, rather than by the Yellowhead Pass to Bute Inlet, Premier Robert Beaven asked Lord Lorne whether it would be possible for Vancouver Island to become a separate kingdom with Princess Louise as queen. First Nations titled Lord Lorne as Great Brother-in-Law as he and Louise travelled across the Prairies.

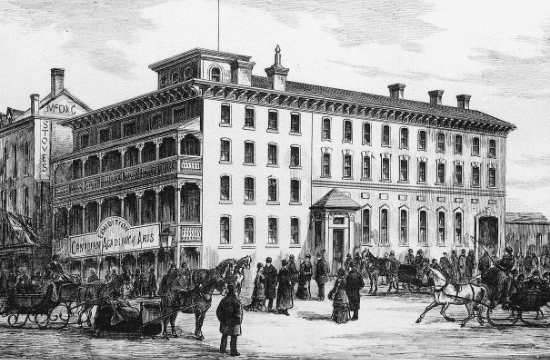
The Canadian Academy of Arts Building, Ottawa, Ontario, 1880

Princess Louise and Lord Lorne made a number of lasting contributions to Canadian society, especially in the realm of the arts and sciences, including the establishment of the Royal Society of Canada, the Royal Canadian Academy of Arts, and the National Gallery of Canada. Louise was proficient in watercolour and oil painting, hanging many of her own works around Rideau Hall and painting sprigs of apple blossoms on doors along the palace's Monck wing corridor (one of which remains to the present), as well as overseeing the creation of the statue of Queen Victoria that stands on McGill University's campus. Various locations were named for her, including the province of Alberta, and the Princess herself gave the name Regina to the capital of Saskatchewan. In all, Louise made such an impression on Canadian life that, at her funeral, on 12 December 1939, her coffin was bourne by her own Canadian regiment, the Argyll and Sutherland Highlanders of Canada.

== The end of Victoria's reign ==
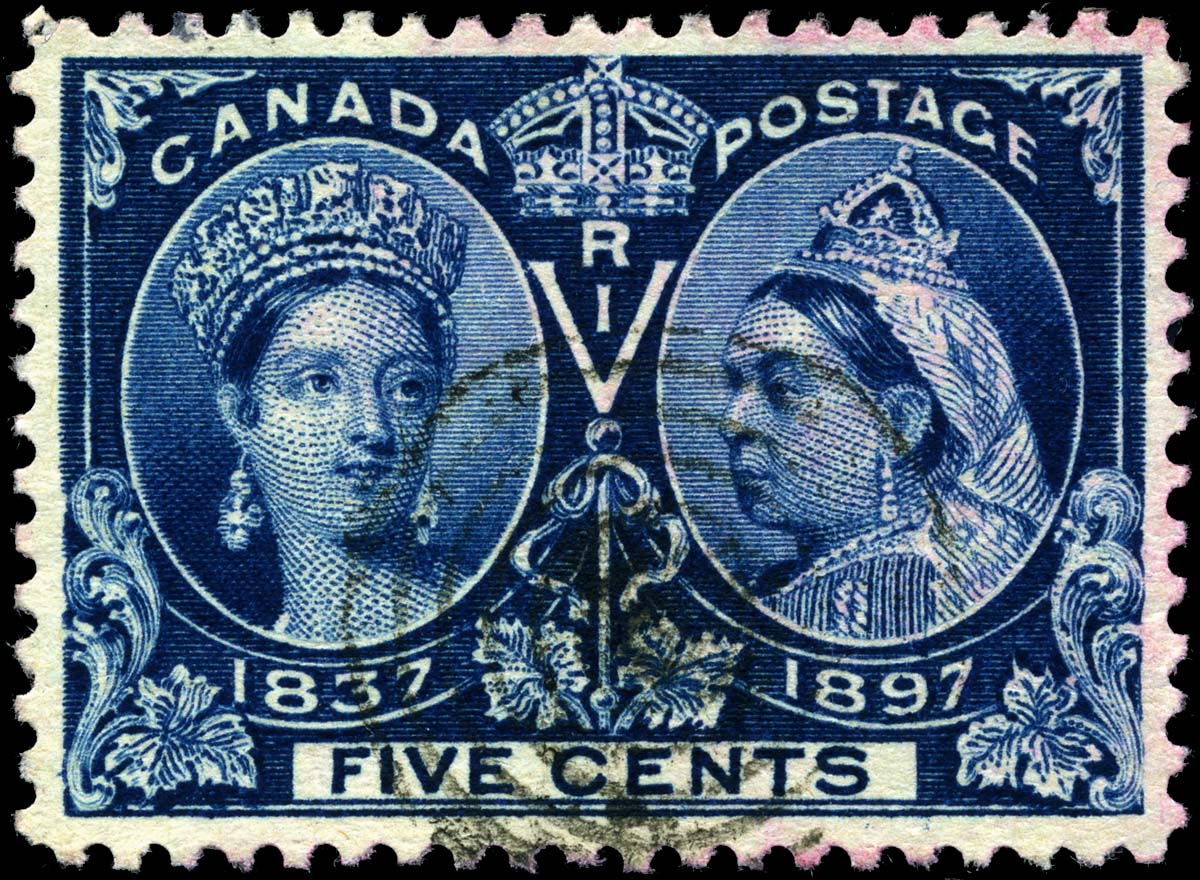
A Canadian stamp commemorating Queen Victoria's Diamond Jubilee, with depictions of the Queen as she appeared in 1837 and 1897

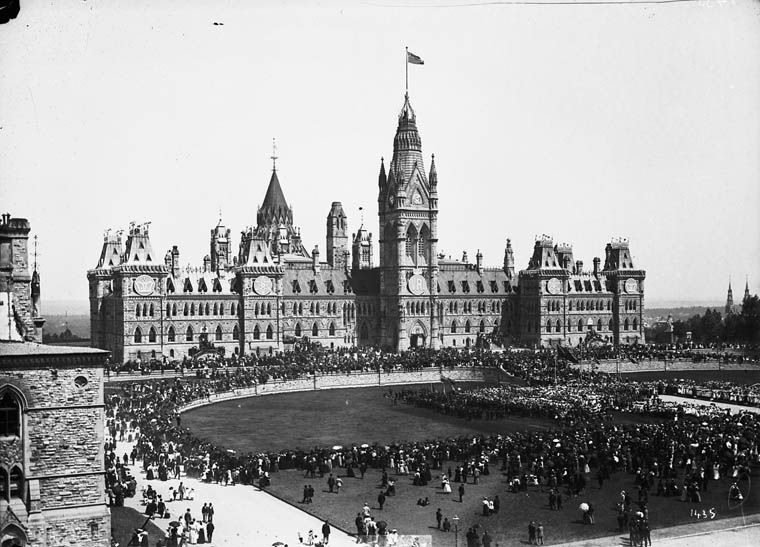
Celebrations for Queen Victoria's Diamond Jubilee on Parliament Hill in Ottawa, Ontario, 1897

In Queen Victoria's latter years, both her Golden and Diamond Jubilees—held in 1887 and 1897, respectively—were marked with great displays and public ceremonies in Canada. Victoria was the first of Canada's monarchs to reach those milestones. Thanksgiving holidays were held to celebrate the occasions. Prime Minister John A. Macdonald was in London for the Golden Jubilee and there, along with the premiers of the other Dominions, attended a conference that turned out to be the forerunner of the modern Commonwealth Heads of Government Meeting. The anniversary was monumentalized in Canada by the establishment of public service institutions, such as the Royal Jubilee Hospital in Victoria, British Columbia.

For the Diamond Jubilee in Britain, Prime Minister Wilfrid Laurier was invited and Canadian cavalrymen, five-abreast and followed by Laurier in a carriage, led the Dominions contingent of the royal procession through London on 22 June. The Toronto Grenadiers (today the Royal Regiment of Canada) and the Black Watch (Royal Highland Regiment) of Canada also took part. In Canada, a series of commemorative stamps, the first ever produced by the country, was issued on 19 June and streets were decorated in cities and towns to mark Accession Day and the 22 June public holiday, on which fêtes brought Canadians of different ethnicities together. On that day, the Queen sent a telegram to all the Dominions, the message arriving in Canada five minutes after being sent from Buckingham Palace. To Canadians, she wrote, "from my heart, I thank my beloved people. May God bless them." Led by the Marchioness of Aberdeen (then the viceregal consort of Canada), Canada's gift to the Queen was the creation of the Victorian Order of Nurses, which still operates today. In contemporary popular culture, new songs were composed in the Queen's honour and buildings named for her.

In between the jubilees, in December 1894, Prime Minister John Thompson died at Windsor Castle when there to be admitted by the Queen to the imperial Privy Council, being struck with a heart attack mere hours after the ceremony. Victoria, then aged and using a wheelchair, was wheeled into St George's Chapel, where Thompson lay-in-state, and placed a wreath on her former prime minister's coffin. This moment was captured in a painting by Frederic Bell-Smith, but the canvas was destroyed in the burning of the Centre Block in 1916.

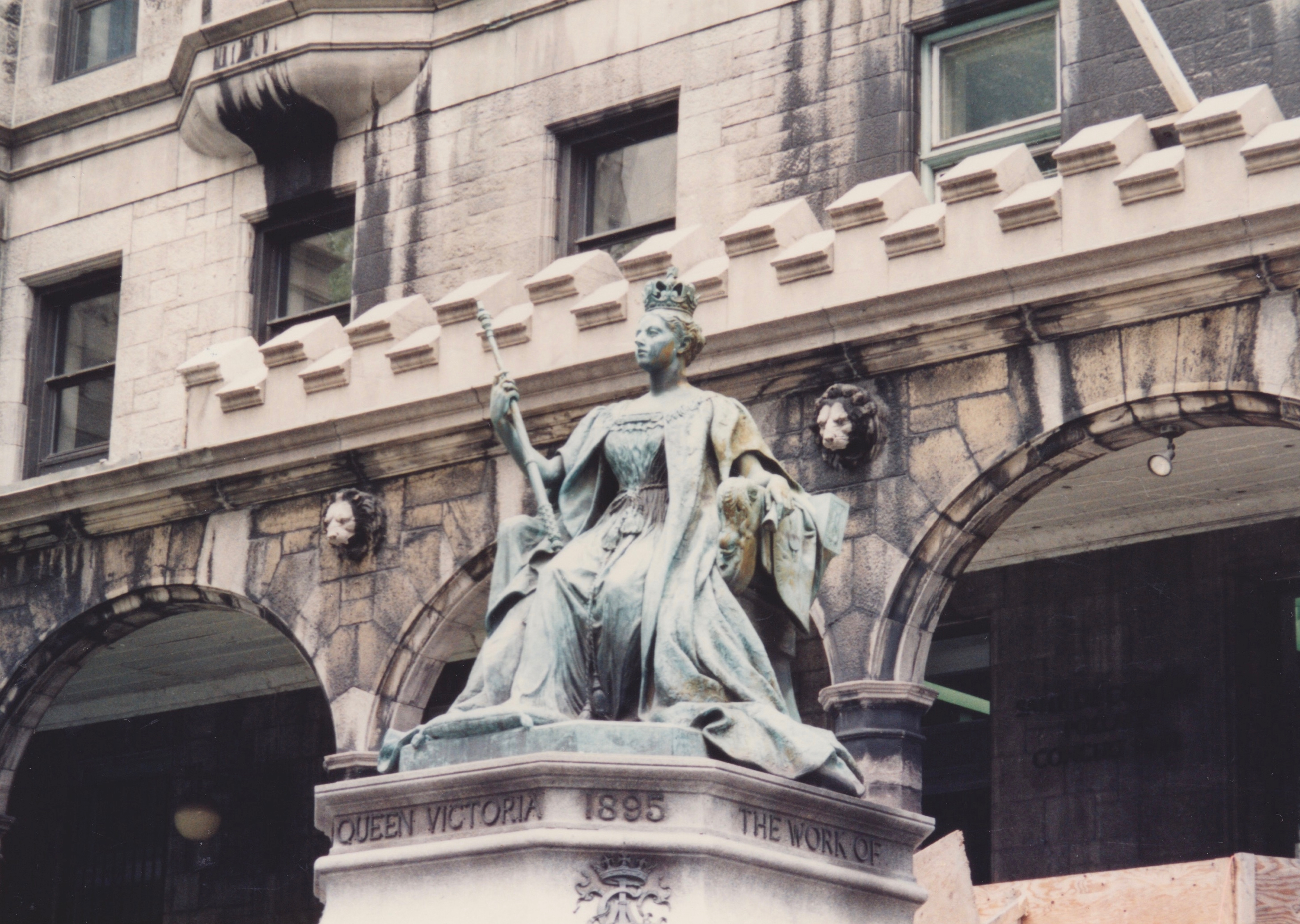
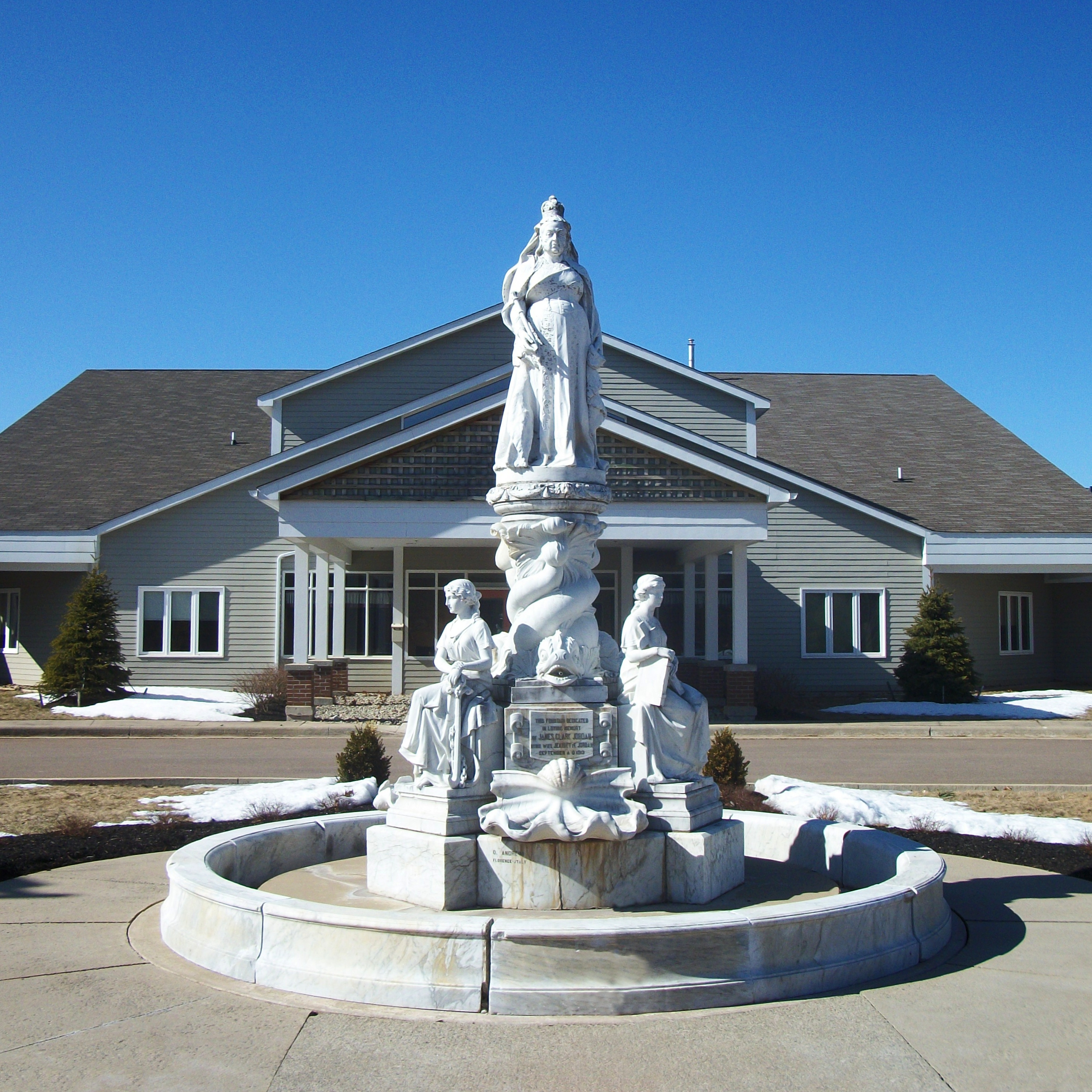
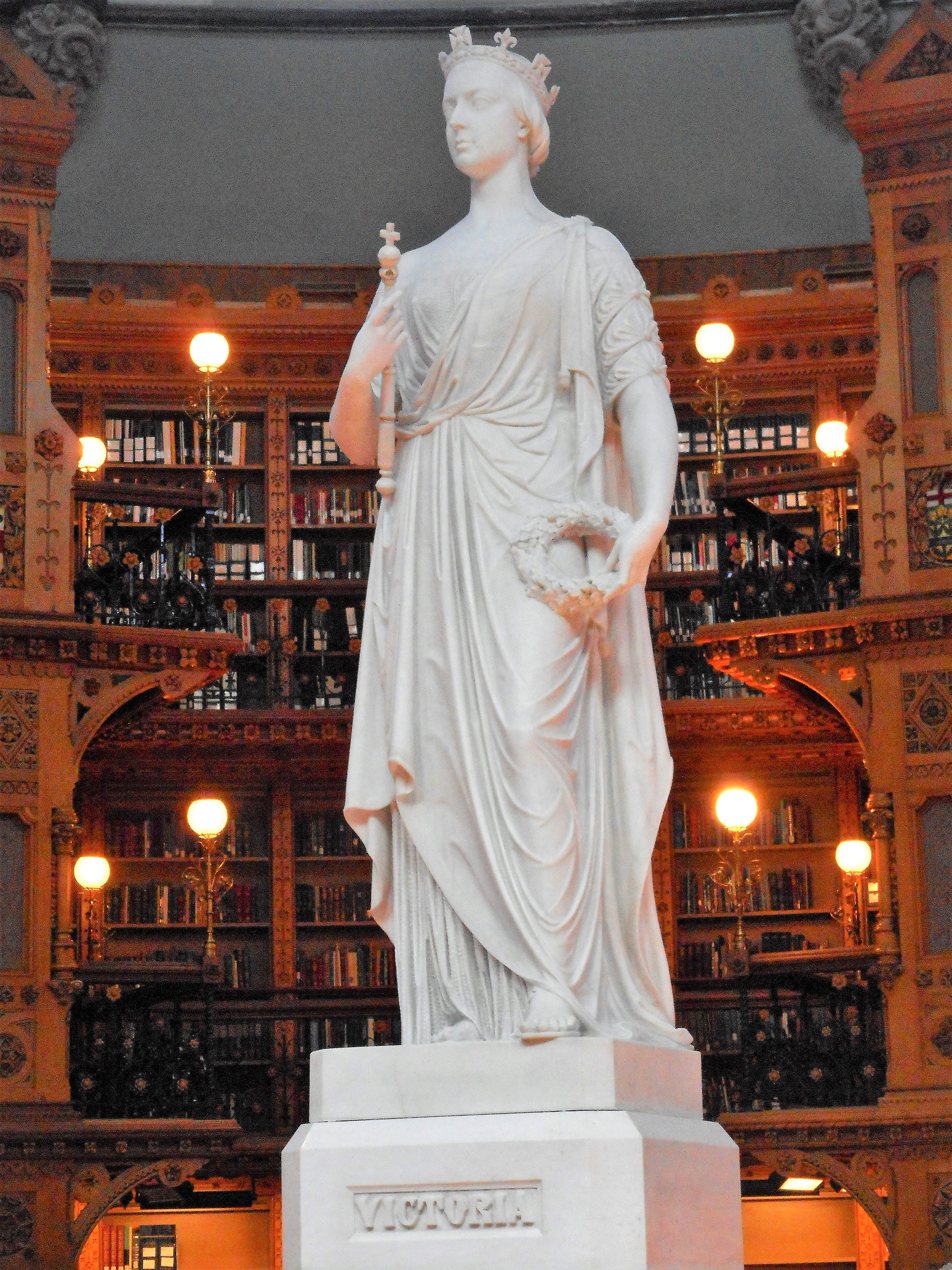
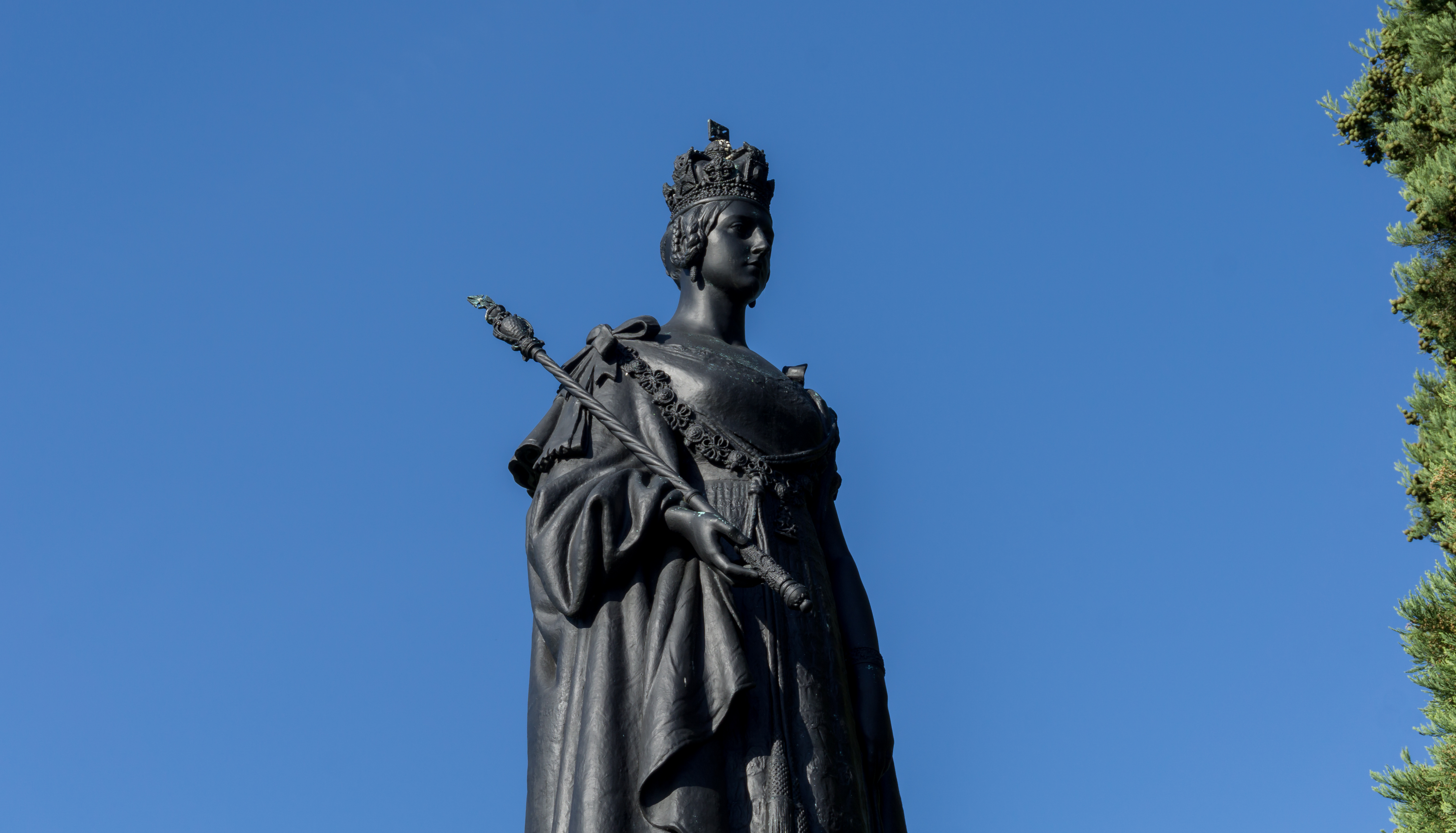
Statues of Queen Victoria in (clockwise from top) Montreal, Quebec; Ottawa, Ontario; Victoria, British Columbia; River Glade, New Brunswick

Victoria herself died at Osborne House on 22 January 1901, after a reign lasting almost 64 years, and was succeeded by her eldest son, King Edward VII. Canada mourned the loss of Victoria; news "brought much of the country to a halt"; Church bells were rung for hours, gun salutes fired at Parliament Hill and armouries across the country, and concerts and social events were cancelled. The day of the funeral was a nationwide period of mourning, with the majority of businesses closed; Victorian mourning etiquette dictated Canadians continue to wear black clothes or armbands for up to three months following Victoria's death and black crepe was draped over public buildings. The Earl of Minto, then Governor General, and Wilfrid Laurier were at odds over which church in Ottawa should host the official memorial service for the late Queen; Minto favoured the Church of England cathedral, respecting the church to which Victoria had belonged, while Laurier and other ministers attended services of their own communion.

Due to the transatlantic telegraph cable, this was the first time Canadians would learn of their monarch's passing within minutes of it being announced in the United Kingdom. However, otherwise, the country's denizens had been mostly unaware of the Queen having been in poor health; the media and society around the royal family was taciturn regarding the sovereign's frailties. As such, upon hearing of Victoria's death, many Canadians double-checked with the cable dispatches posted on bulletin boards outside newspaper offices.

Victoria's long and popular reign resulted in many places being named in her honour and monuments to her, such as statues on Parliament Hill and throughout the provinces. The Queen's reign was permanently memorialized in Canada when, in the spring of 1901, it was decided by parliament that 24 May would continue as a holiday marking the late Queen's birthday, named as Victoria Day, to distinguish it from the King's birthday celebration to be held in November.

== Twentieth century and the First World War ==
The end of Victoria's reign marked the beginning of a new century and one that would see Canada's rapid growth as a nation. As modern modes of transportation allowed for easier travel across the oceans, more of the royal family came to tour the King's northern Dominion. The first since Queen Victoria's death was Prince George (later King George V)—the son of the reigning king—returning to Canada in 1901, accompanied by his wife, the Duchess of Cornwall and York (later Quen Mary), and her brother, Prince Alexander of Teck (who would, in future, serve as governor general of Canada). Events during the royal tour, which took in the country between Quebec City and Victoria, had a more casual atmosphere than their equivalents in the United Kingdom; it was reported that, at one official dinner, the couple "shook hands with between two and three thousand guests, never appearing tired, but always manifesting signs of interest, bowing, and smiling to all presented to them."

Prince George, Duke of Cornwall and York, in Montreal and Quebec City during his 1901 royal tour

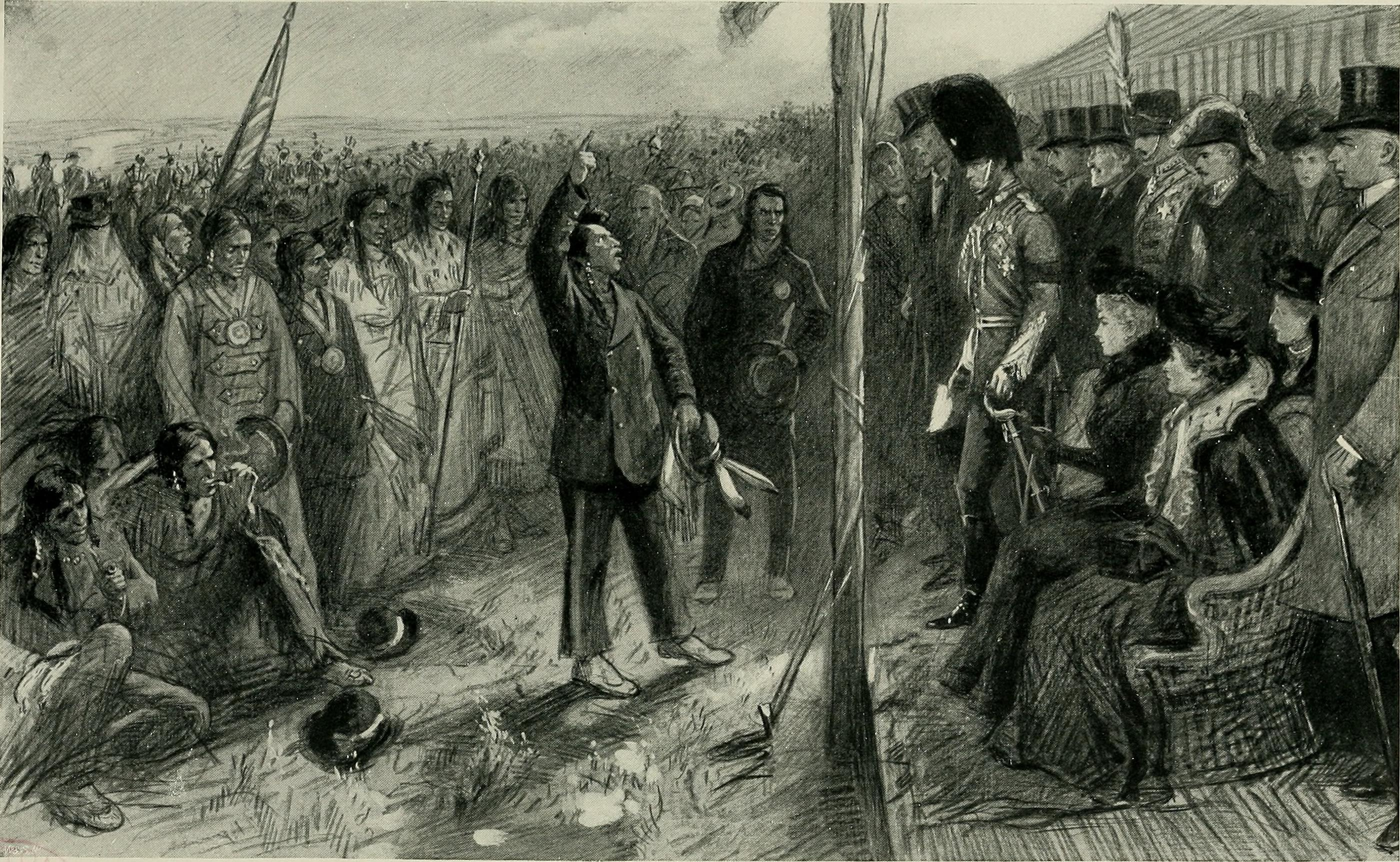
Prince George, with the Duchess of Cornwall and York, listens to addresses from leaders of the Blackfoot, Káínaa, Piegan, Tsúùtʼínà, Îyârhe Nakoda, and Néhinaw peoples at Shagannapi Point, near Calgary, Alberta, 28 September 1901

The Prince returned only once more before he became king: when he visited in 1908, by then as Prince of Wales, to celebrate the tercentenary of Quebec City's founding. He reviewed the Canadian armed forces on the Plains of Abraham, in addition to presenting a cheque for 90,000 pounds to aid the federal Crown in purchasing the area of the plains so as to establish a park, which was opened on 17 March 1908. The Prince wrote to his father, "I hope my visit has done good, especially to improve the relations between the English and French Canadians, which have never been so good as they are now." The governor general at the time, the Earl Grey, reported back to King Edward VII that the Prince "has taught the people of Quebec how to cheer."

Edward VII died two years later, which led to a period of official mourning, with numerous memorials, military parades, and tributes held across the country; the funeral day was made an official holiday. However, due to Edward's relatively short reign, his passing was not as impactful on Canadians as his mother's had been. Newspapers were more forthright in their coverage than they had been at the time of Victoria's death; they reported right away on Queen Alexandra's last moments with the King and some even pointed at Edward's smoking habit as a contributor to his demise.

Edward was succeeded by Prince George and Canada sent 700 dignitaries and military personnel to take part in the celebrations in London. In 1911, the King appointed his uncle, Prince Arthur, as governor general of Canada, thereby fulfilling the desire of Canadians earlier expressed by the Lady Lisgar and bringing Arthur back to Canada for a fourth time and as the first natural member of the royal family to serve as the Canadian federal viceroy. King George V was reported to have had much to do with the appointment. Arthur brought with him to Canada his wife, Princess Louise, and his youngest daughter, Princess Patricia, and the family travelled extensively across Canada, the Prince performing ceremonial tasks, such as in 1917 laying the cornerstone of the reconstructed federal parliament building. The royal couple made a concerted effort to contribute to the social life of the capital, using Rideau Hall as a major site for events for Canadians from across the country.

Two years after Arthur's appointment, his nephew, Prince Albert (the future King George VI), arrived as a midshipman on HMS Cumberland, spending six months visiting Ontario (seeing Niagara Falls and Toronto), Prince Edward Island (where he umpired a cricket match), and Quebec and Newfoundland (enjoying salmon fishing).

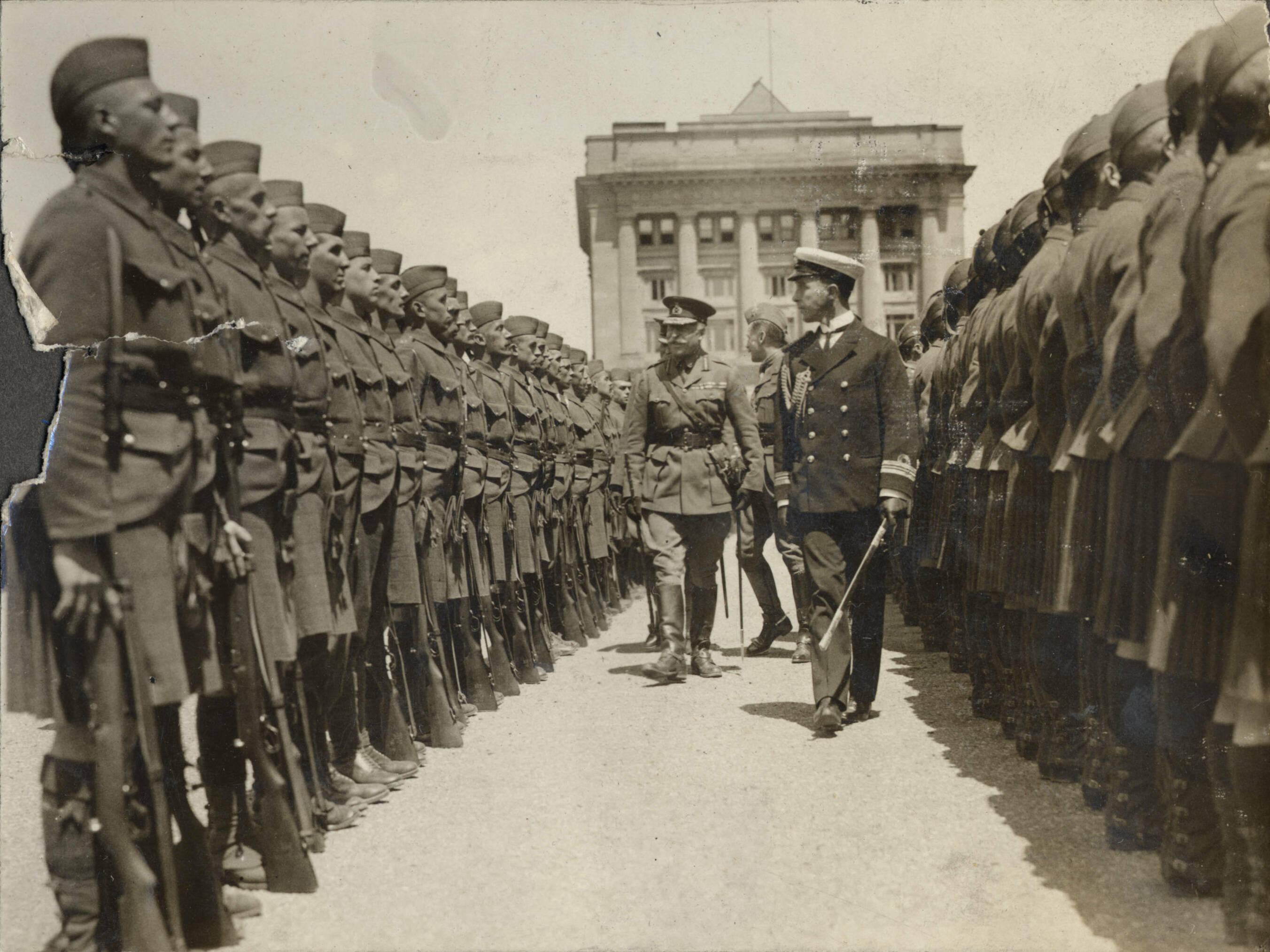
Prince Arthur (centre left), in 1914, inspecting the troops at Valcartier base, near Montreal, Quebec, before they were transported to Europe

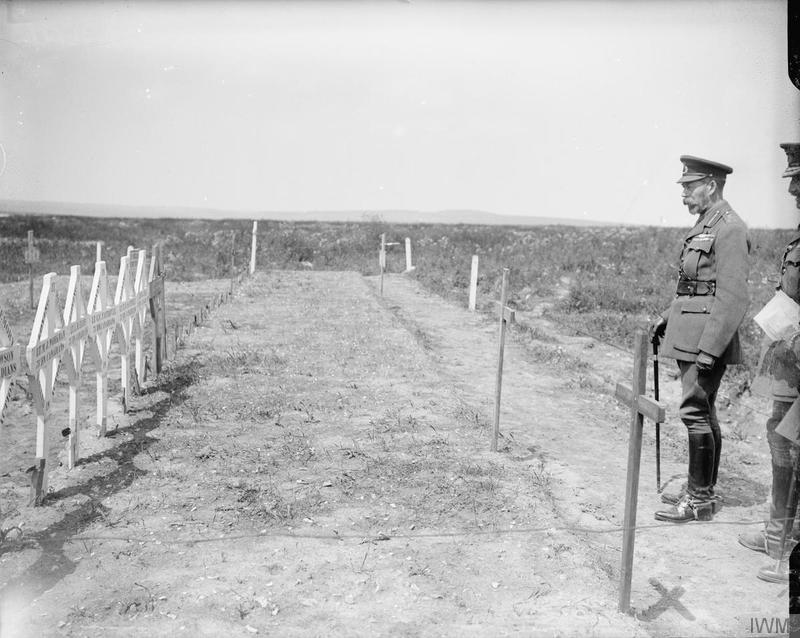
King George V regards the graves of Canadian soldiers on the battlefield of Vimy Ridge, accompanied by General Arthur Currie, in Pas-de-Calais, France, 11 July 1917

Prince Arthur was, though, sometimes thought to have overstepped the still un-cemented bounds of constitutional monarchy in Canada, particularly in his carrying out of the ceremonial duties of the commander-in-chief during the First World War. Overall, though, Prince Arthur stressed the importance of Canadian military contributions, promoting training and readiness for Canadian troops, but also sought to enhance charity at home. To put this preaching into practice, the Duchess of Connaught, in addition to establishing the Duchess of Connaught Hospital Fund and working for the Red Cross and other organisations, for Christmas in 1915 sent a card and a box of maple sugar to every Canadian serving overseas. She also had a knitting machine brought to Rideau Hall, which she used to make thousands of pairs of socks for soldiers. Prince Arthur was active in auxiliary war services and charities, conducted a number hospital visits, and, following the war, commissioned a stained glass window, located in St Bartholomew's Church, next to Rideau Hall, in memory of the Government House staff who lost their lives during the war.

The Connaughts' daughter became a prominent public figure during the Duke's time as Governor General, acting as hostess at Rideau Hall while her mother was ill. During the war, the Princess Patricia's Canadian Light Infantry was created and named after Patricia, who embroidered the regimental colours herself. The Princess was, on 22 February 1918, appointed by the King as colonel-in-chief of the regiment; an appointment she held until her death. She contributed her paintings to Canadian exhibitions and galleries and, in 1917, her image appeared on the $1 bill. Additionally, it was during her time in Rideau Hall that Patricia met her future husband, Alexander Ramsay, who was then acting as aide-de-camp to her father.

The King and Queen called on Canadian troops stationed in the United Kingdom, as well as the nurses of Canada's Red Cross Hospital. The King often visited the Western Front on the European continent, meeting with members of the Canadian Expeditionary Force and touring Canadian field hospitals. General Arthur Currie was, in June 1917, knighted by the George V on the battlefield at Vimy Ridge. The King kept up correspondence with Prince Arthur, discussing conditions on the home front in Canada. To deflect anti-German feelings away from the monarchy, George V issued in 1917 letters patent changing the name of the royal house from Saxe-Coburg and Gotha (established when Queen Victoria married Prince Albert) to Windsor and stripping German royal titles from anyone in the royal family who had them, such as his wife, who was a princess of Teck, and her brother, Prince Alexander, who took the surname Cambridge and became the Earl of Athlone.

At the end of 1916, Prince Arthur publicly expressed his regret at having to leave Canada, as he and his family had grown very comfortable there. The royal family left a legacy behind them: Port Arthur (now part of Thunder Bay, Ontario) was named in honour of the Prince, who also gave his name to the Connaught Cup for pistol marksmanship of recruits in the Royal North-West Mounted Police.

== Interwar period ==
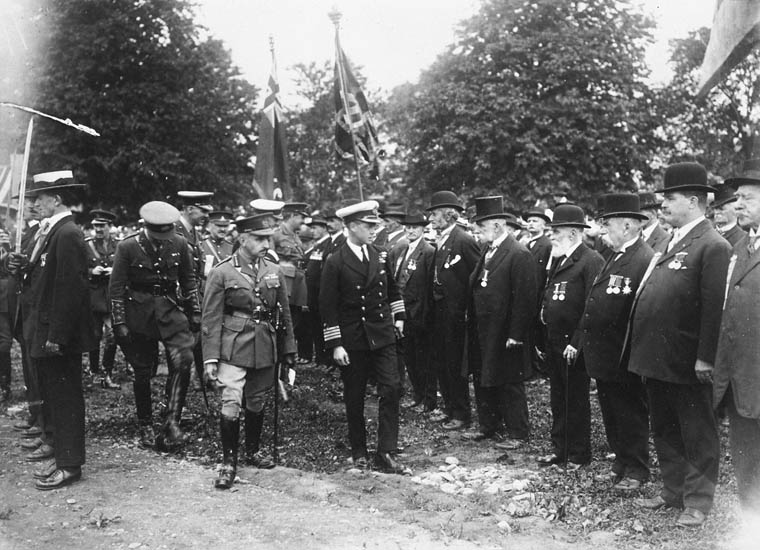
Prince Edward (centre) inspects and gives medals to veterans of the First World War, Halifax, Nova Scotia, 17 August 1919

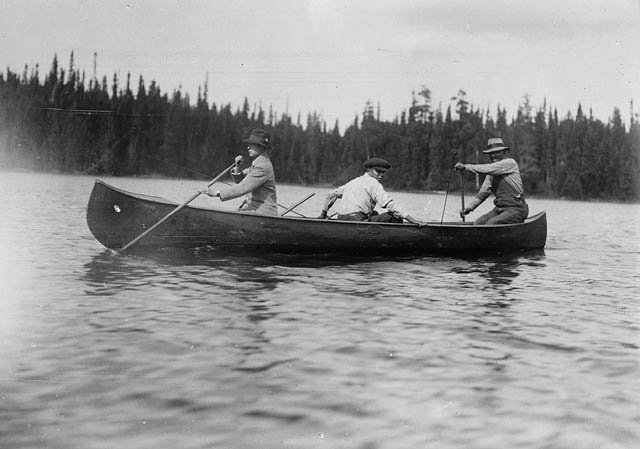
Prince Edward canoeing on the Nipigon River in Ontario, 5 to 7 September 1919

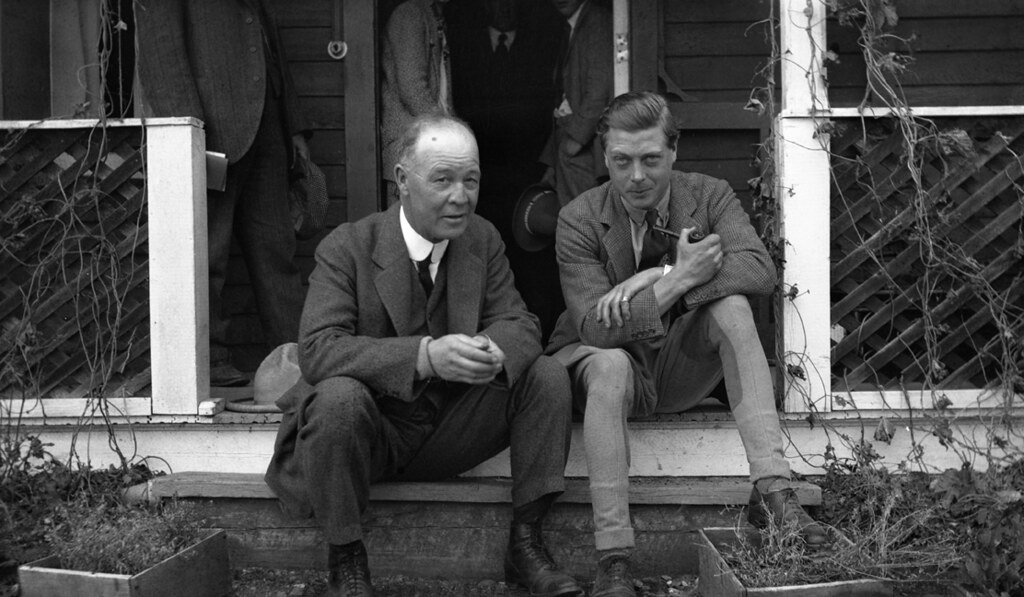
Prince Edward, Prince of Wales, with Mayor of Calgary George Harry Webster at the Prince's ranch, E.P. Ranch, in Pekisko, Alberta, September 1923

After the end of the war, Prince Edward, Prince of Wales (later King Edward VIII), toured Canada in 1919, opening the third session of the 13th Canadian Parliament, amongst other duties performed when he had not disappeared to attend dances or to play golf, instead. He proved very popular with Canadians, though; when, in Toronto, he was greeted with enthusiasm by a crowd of soldiers just returned from Europe after the end of the war, who lifted Edward off his horse and "passed him, like a football, over their heads," and a veteran approached the Prince and casually said: "put it there, Ed." From that point on Edward shook hands with anyone who approached him, to the point where his right hand "became so black, swollen and painful from the continued enthusiastic handshaking that, in his own words, he 'retired it temporarily from Imperial service, and offered the left instead." Edward returned to Ottawa to lay the foundation stone of the Peace Tower before returning to the United Kingdom. Canada proved popular with the Prince as well; he purchased the 400-acre (1.6 km^{2}) E.P. Ranch near Pekisko, High River, in Alberta; Edward held this ranch, and stayed at it numerous times, before selling it in 1962, a decade before his death.

Events took place in 1926 that would set the course for a dramatic shift in the role of the federal viceroy and ultimately result in the creation of a distinct monarchy for Canada. Until that point, the governor general remained a representative in Canada of the British government—the King in his British Council—but was still able to exercise the royal prerogative over the Canadian prime minister without orders from the King acting on the advice of his British ministers back in Westminster. After the Governor General at the time, the Lord Byng of Vimy, did just that and independently decided to refuse the advice of his Canadian Prime Minister, William Lyon Mackenzie King, to dissolve Parliament, thus forcing Mackenzie King to resign in what came to be known as the King–Byng Affair, the latter was, once reappointed following that year's general election, motivated to raise at the 1926 Imperial Conference questions about the relationship between the Dominions and the United Kingdom.

The premiers were mostly receptive and, following the close of the meeting, the Balfour Declaration was issued, which stated that the Dominions of the Crown were to be considered equal to the United Kingdom, as Mackenzie King had wished. The governor general of Canada, as with all the other governors-general of the Empire, would be the direct, personal representative of the King, rather than a diplomatic channel between the Canadian and British governments.

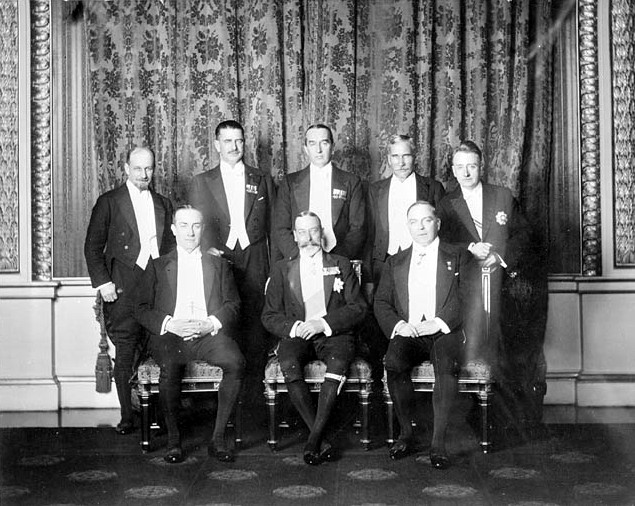
George V with his prime ministers at the 1926 Imperial Conference

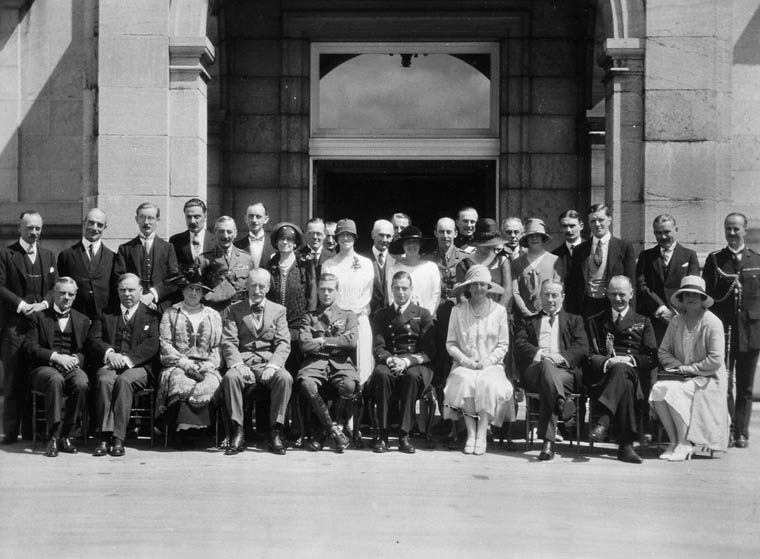
Governor General the Viscount Willingdon with Princes Edward and George and Prime Minister W.L.M. King in front of Rideau Hall, Ottawa, Ontario, 4 August 1927

The first evocation of these concepts in statute law was seen in 1927. Passed by the British Parliament, the Royal and Parliamentary Titles Act altered part of the King's title to reflect his new status as monarch of each Dominion individually, rather than as king of the United Kingdom throughout all countries. Then, in 1931—following deliberations involving Canada's delegation, led by Minister of Justice and Attorney General of Canada Ernest Lapointe—the notions of independence and equality were manifested in the Statute of Westminster's legal end to the Westminster Parliament's ability to legislate for the Dominions without the expressed request and consent of the latter. As a result, laws outlining the succession—notably, the Act of Settlement, 1701—as pertaining to Canada, were now under the control of the Canadian Parliament and the King could only be advised on Canadian affairs by his Canadian ministers; the monarchy of Canada had "assumed its full constitutional meaning." This had widespread support from Quebec's political elite, as along with its own Crown, Canada gained control over its foreign policy and became distinct from the United Kingdom and its empire.

Through 1927, King George V and his consort, Queen Mary, opened Canada House in London and the King's sons, Princes Edward and George, unveiled the Laurier monument on Parliament Hill and dedicated the Princes' Gates and opened Union Station in Toronto, after which Edward went to Alberta to spend time on his ranch.

Though the Canadian Cabinet had in 1930 suggested to the King that he appoint his other son, Prince Albert, Duke of York, as governor general of Canada, both George V and the Duke were hesitant; the latter had two young daughters—a toddler (later Queen Elizabeth II) and a newborn (Princess Margaret)—and the former wished that Albert remain close to compensate for the behaviour of the Prince of Wales. As the Statute of Westminster had not yet been implemented, the British Cabinet eventually advised against the Canadian idea and, instead, recommended the Earl of Bessborough as viceroy. This, though. was ultimately because the Lord Passfield, then the Minister for the Dominions, thought that, despite the request directly from their government, Canadians disliked the royal family. As Albert eventually went on to become King George VI, had the Canadian Privy Council's idea been accepted, a Canadian governor general who represented the King would have gone on to become king of Canada himself.

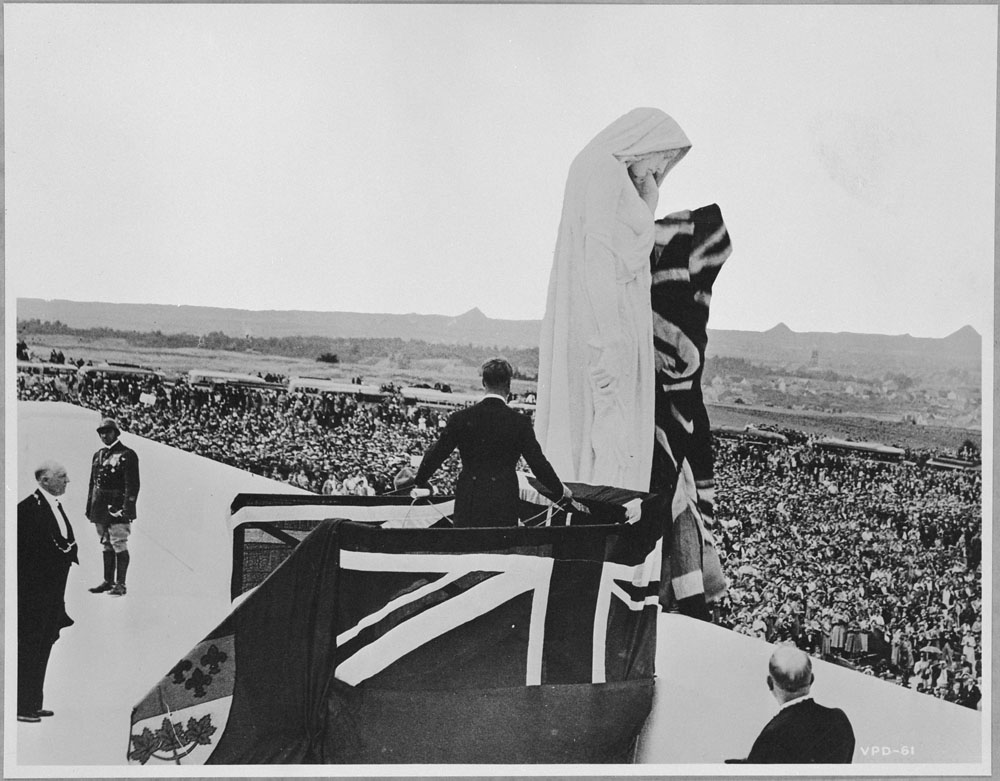
King Edward VIII, in his capacity as the king of Canada, unveils the Vimy Memorial in France, July 1936

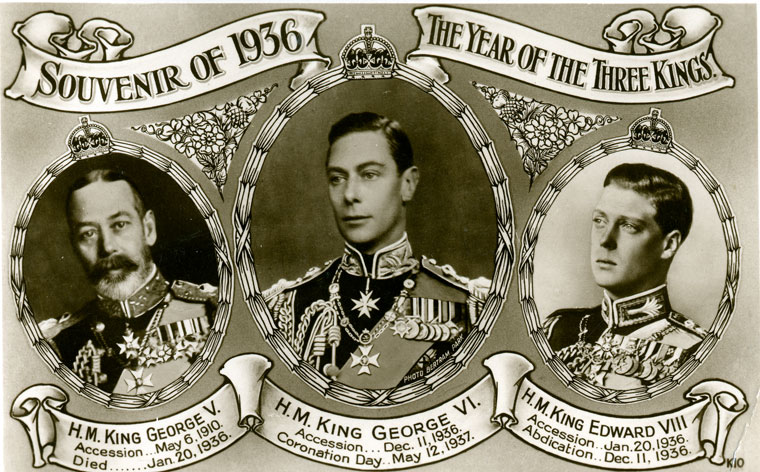
A postcard commemorating "the year of the three kings": George V, Edward VIII, and George VI

Canadians (and the Commonwealth as a whole) heard in 1932 the first Royal Christmas Message, as read by George V, who, three years later, celebrated his Silver Jubilee. The euphoria was short lived, however, as the King died on 20 January 1936. Announcements were made over radio; but, then the broadcasters fell silent for the rest of the night out of respect. Through the following week, courthouses were shut, the Legislative Assembly of Ontario delayed the opening of its new session so members of provincial parliament could recite new oaths of allegiance, and the University of Toronto cancelled social events (though, not classes). On 28 January, the day of the late King's funeral, the Governor General issued a proclamation encouraging Canadians to attend church services and for Crown-owned buildings to be draped in black crepe.

The hope that surrounded the accession of Prince Edward as King Edward VIII did not, as with Edward's reign, survive the year. However, Edward was the first monarch of Canada to accede to the country's throne by Canada's own laws and, as such, it was deemed "constitutionally inappropriate" for Canada's (and the other Dominions') accession proclamations to be approved by a British order-in-council. Early into his time as monarch, Edward, in July 1936, took his only foreign trip as sovereign, to unveil the Canadian National Vimy Memorial in France, in his capacity as the king of Canada.

== Abdication and the king of Canada comes home ==
Despite his popularity in Canada and elsewhere when he was Prince of Wales, the new King's relationship with the twice-divorced, American socialite Wallis Simpson caused serious concern; more so among Canadians, who were more familiar with the personal life of their sovereign than the populace of the UK, due to the British press imposing on itself a ban on publishing the exploits of the King and Simpson that the American newspapers did not. Governor General the Lord Tweedsmuir conveyed to Buckingham Palace and British Prime Minister Stanley Baldwin his observations of Canadians' deep affection for the King; but, also the outrage towards Canadian puritanism—both Catholic and Protestant—that would occur if Edward VIII married a divorcée. Further, the Cabinet telegrammed the King, urging him to place his duty as sovereign above his feelings for Simpson. As popular anger mounted in tandem with the imminence of a marriage between Edward and Simpson, the King's prime ministers sought solutions to the crisis. Mackenzie King, along with the other Dominion first ministers, rejected the ideas of either a royal or morganatic marriage taking place. This left only Edward's abdication as the final option.

Edward VIII renounced his Canadian Crown on 10 December, giving, with the consent of his Canadian ministers, royal assent to His Majesty's Declaration of Abdication Act 1936. Consequently, his brother, Prince Albert, became Canada's king, choosing the regnal name George VI. A proclamation of accession was drafted by the Cabinet and read by the Prime Minister as a radio broadcast. The Canadian Parliament later passed the Succession to the Throne Act, 1937, to ratify the abdication into Canadian law and demonstrate Canada's independence from the United Kingdom. Mackenzie King wrote in his diary just before the abdication that he had "no fears about Canada [...] [I]n all probability, with the Duke and Duchess of York as king and queen, and with the little Princess Elizabeth in the picture, there will be a much happier situation in the new year than there has been at any time since the time of George V."

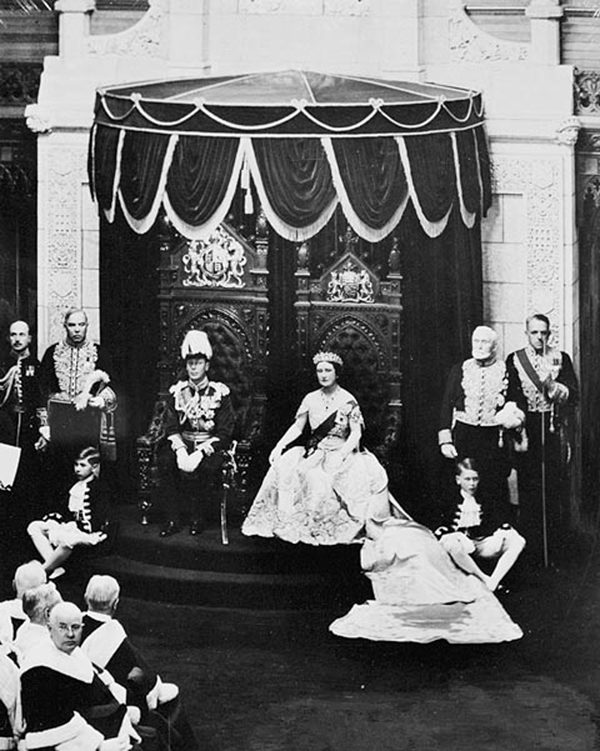
King George VI giving royal assent to bills in the Canadian Senate, accompanied by Queen Elizabeth, during their 1939 royal tour of Canada

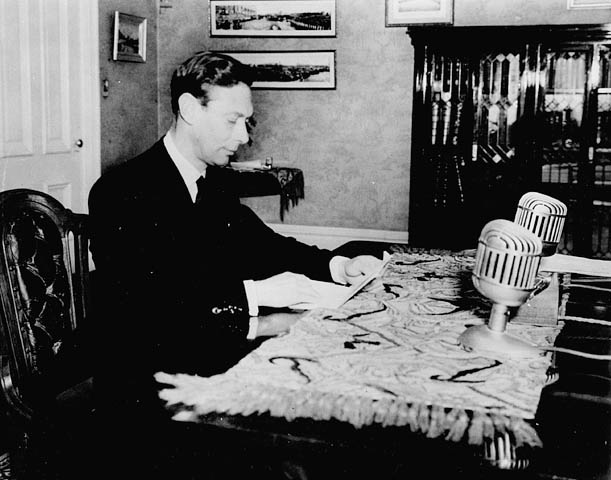
King George VI delivers his Empire Day speech by radio from Government House in Winnipeg, Manitoba, 24 May 1939

In an effort to foster Canadian identity, Tweedsmuir conceived in 1937 of a royal tour by the monarch, so that, through seeing "their king performing royal functions, supported by his Canadian ministers," Canadians might be made more aware of their country's status as an independent kingdom. Mackenzie King agreed with this notion; though, he also felt, along with officials in the United Kingdom, that the trip would have an element of public relations: the presence of the King and Queen, in both Canada and the United States, was calculated to shore up sympathy for Britain in anticipation of hostilities with Nazi Germany. Thus, Tweedsmuir put the suggestion to the King and the Prime Minister, while in London for the coronation in May 1937, formally consulted with George on the matter. More than a year later, the King agreed. Officials in the Dominions Office in London, however, resisted the reality of a separate role for George VI as Canada's sovereign.

On 17 May 1939, the king of Canada, accompanied by his royal consort, Queen Elizabeth, sailed up to Quebec City on the Canadian Pacific liner RMS Empress of Australia, escorted by two destroyers and two cruisers of the Royal Canadian Navy. George stepped ashore at Wolfe's Cove, becoming the first reigning sovereign of Canada to set foot on Canadian soil. The reaction by the public was positive beyond expectation and, from the start, it was noted that the King was present as Canada's sovereign; a newspaper at the time stated, "the King of Canada walked yesterday, as he walks today, among his own. There can be welcomes elsewhere in Canada equal to his reception in Quebec. None will surpass it."

Of the King and Queen's arrival Rideau Hall, on 20 May, official royal tour historian Gustave Lanctot wrote, "when Their Majesties walked into their Canadian residence, the Statute of Westminster had assumed full reality: the king of Canada had come home." While in the nation's capital, George set to carrying out his royal duties, including receiving the new American envoy to Canada, granting royal assent to nine bills passed by Parliament, and ratifying treaties, while the Queen laid the cornerstone of the Supreme Court of Canada building. The King presided over celebrations on Parliament Hill for his official birthday in Canada—the first time this had been marked in the presence of the sovereign himself—and he dedicated the National War Memorial. It was there that the King and Queen conducted the first-ever royal walkabout: rather than return to their motorcade at the end of the official ceremony, George and Elizabeth spent half an hour mingling casually among the 25,000 veterans, who were part of a crowd of some 100,000 people. The act was remarkable, as, at the time, royalty was generally perceived to be distant. Tweedsmuir captured the importance of the moment: "One old fellow said to me, 'aye, man, if Hitler could just see this.' It was wonderful proof of what a people's king means."

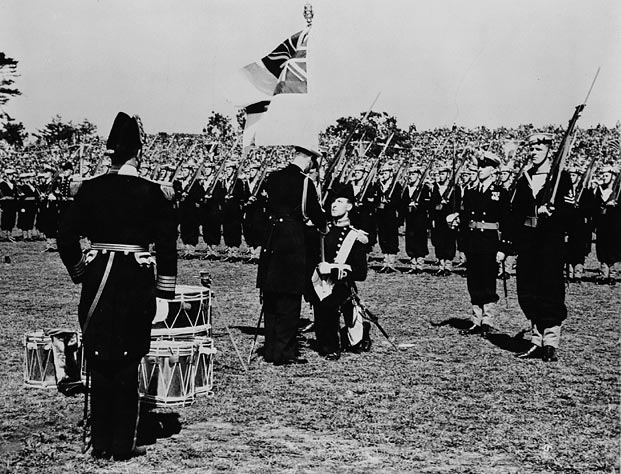
King George VI presents the King's Colour to his Royal Canadian Navy in Beacon Hill Park, Victoria, British Columbia, June 1939

While travelling on the Royal Train to the west coast and back, meeting thousands of Canadians along the way (by the end of the first week alone, two million of Canada's 11 million inhabitants had turned out to see the royal couple), the King, from Government House in Winnipeg, Manitoba, delivered the Empire Day speech by radio to the Dominions and Britain and its colonies; met with the Îyârhe Nakoda outside of Calgary, Alberta; and presented the King's Colour to his Royal Canadian Navy in Victoria, British Columbia. During the return leg, the King and Queen also conducted, between 7 and 10 June, a state visit on behalf of Canada to the United States. The royal couple then returned to Canada, touring the Maritimes and the still separate Dominion of Newfoundland.

== The Second World War and the resident monarchies ==
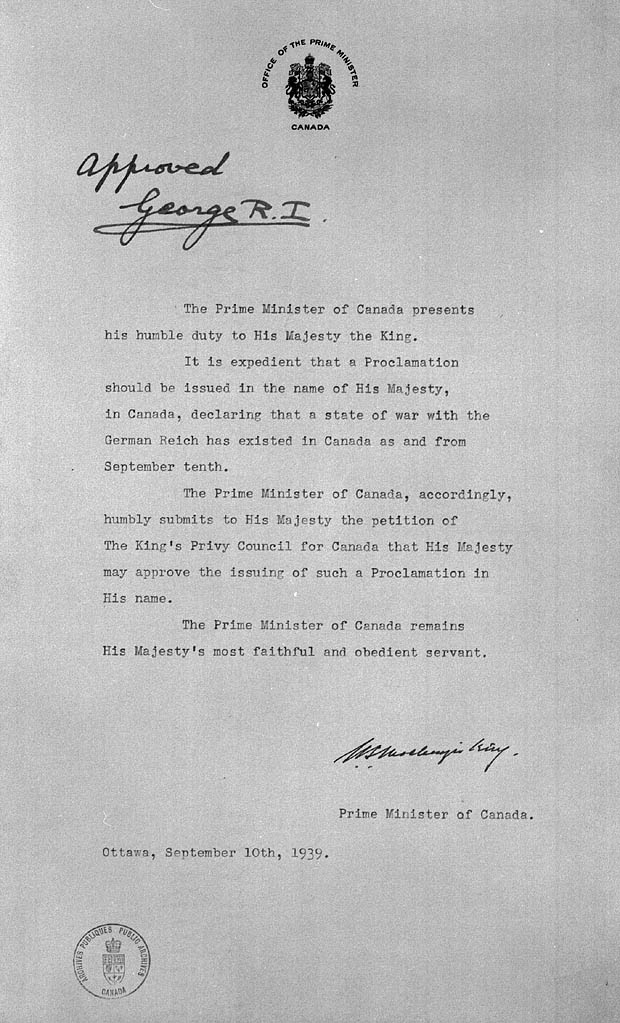
Prime Minister Mackenzie King's request to King George VI for approval that war be declared against Nazi Germany in His Majesty's name, 10 September 1939

Only five months after the departure of George VI and his wife from Canada, Britain declared war on Nazi Germany. The King did so as King of the United Kingdom on 3 September 1939, but, as king of Canada, was not advised by his Canadian ministers to do the same until 10 September. Mackenzie King and Minister of Justice Ernest Lapointe initially argued that Canada was bound by Britain's declaration of war. However, after it was realised that Canada was absent from the list of belligerent states in President of the United States Franklin D. Roosevelt's declaration of neutrality, Parliament was summoned by the Governor General on 7 September and approved of Canada's need to defend itself. These were significant developments, as they became examples for other Dominions to follow, and, by the war's end, F.R. Scott concluded, "it is firmly established as a basic constitutional principle that, so far as relates to Canada, the King is regulated by Canadian law and must act only on the advice and responsibility of Canadian ministers."

Governor General the Lord Tweedsmuir died in February 1940, while still viceroy, and so an uncle of George VI, the Earl of Athlone, was appointed to the post, requiring he and his wife, Princess Alice (a granddaughter of Queen Victoria), and Athlone's Aide-de-Camp, Alastair Windsor, Earl of Macduff (the grandson of previous Governor General Prince Arthur), to make the trans-oceanic journey in the midst of the ongoing Battle of the Atlantic.

The Governor General and Princess Alice became supporters of the Canadian war effort; Alice was appointed Honorary Commandant of a number of women's military services, such as the Women's Royal Canadian Naval Service and the Royal Canadian Air Force Women's Division, while Athlone travelled extensively throughout the country in an effort to spread the message that King George VI was dedicated to fighting totalitarianism. The royal couple hosted the Quebec Conferences in 1943 and 1944, wherein Mackenzie King, Roosevelt, and British Prime Minister Winston Churchill decided the strategies of the western allies that would lead to victory over Nazi Germany and Japan in 1945.

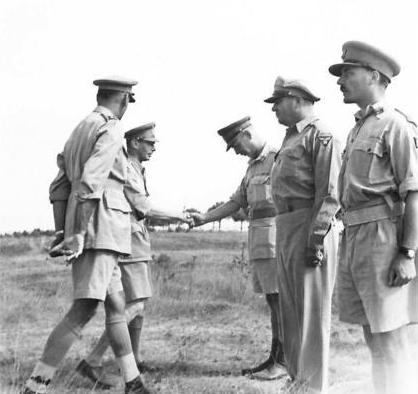
George VI, king of Canada, meets Major General Charles Loewen in the Volturno Valley, Italy, 30 July 1944

As the war threatened the royal family, plans were formed for the King, Queen, and their two children to reside for the duration of the conflict at Hatley Castle, in Colwood, British Columbia, which the King in his federal Council had purchased for use as a royal palace. It was, however, eventually settled that morale in the United Kingdom would be seriously diminished should the King abandon the European front and, so, the royal family would remain in London and Windsor. From there, Canada's monarch and his family engaged with Canadian militia, navy, and airmen and women. For example, to the first men from the 1st Canadian Division to arrive in the UK from Halifax, Nova Scotia, on 16 December 1939, the King wrote, "the British Army will be proud to have as comrades-in-arms the successors of those who came from Canada in the Great War and fought with a heroism that has never been forgotten." Ahead of the Normandy landings on 6 June 1944, the King, along with his Canadian Prime Minister, inspected the formations that were to be sent across the English Channel, including 1st Canadian Parachute Battalion and the 3rd Canadian Division. With the Queen, George inspected the 1st Canadian Division at Aldershot on 8 June. Travelling incognito as "General Coilingwood", the King visited Canadian units in Italy's Volturno Valley in August 1944, there presenting Major John Keefer Mahony with the Victoria Cross.

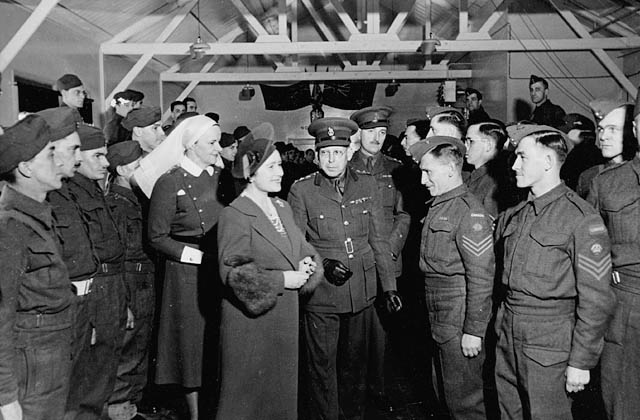
Queen Elizabeth at the 15 Canadian General Hospital, Royal Canadian Army Medical Corps, in Bramshott, UK, 17 March 1941

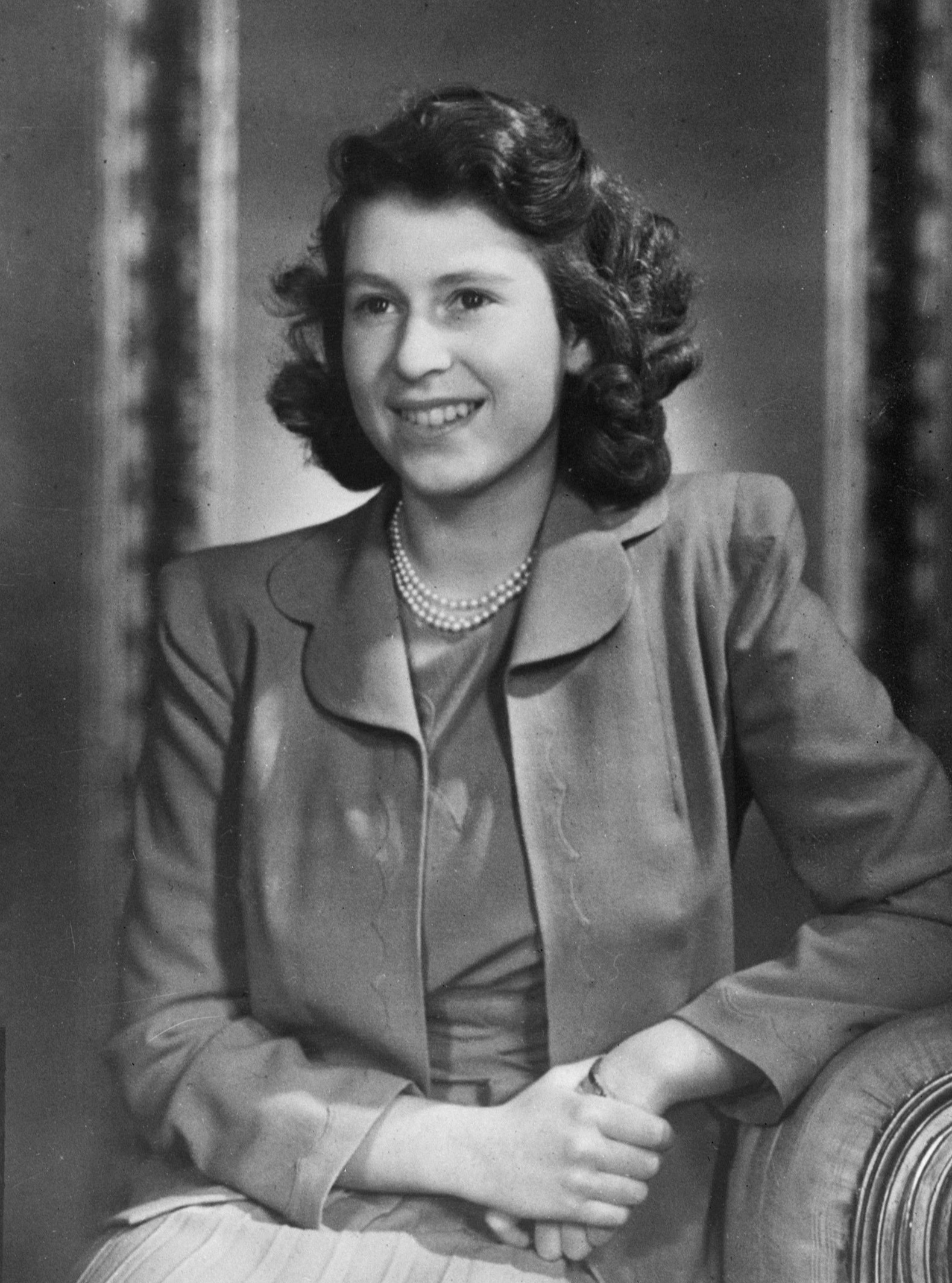
Portrait of Princess Elizabeth (later Queen Elizabeth II) by photographer Yousuf Karsh of Montreal, 1943

Prince George, Duke of Kent (the King's brother), visited air bases and training centres across Canada; Queen Elizabeth made an appeal to Canadian women to contribute to the war efforts; and her daughter, Princess Elizabeth (later Queen Elizabeth II), in 1940, posed for her first official Canadian portrait. With her parents, the Princess visited Canadian service personnel stationed in the United Kingdom and undertook solo duties, such as reviewing a parade of Canadian airwomen in 1945. Two years following, she was appointed by her father as Colonel-in-Chief of Le Régiment de la Chaudière and the 48th Highlanders of Canada, her first appointments in the Canadian military and which she held until her death in 2022. While Mackenzie King was speaking with the King at Buckingham Palace on 23 October 1945, the Princess said she was prepared to shoot the German Führer, Adolf Hitler, if given the chance.

Canada was also home to foreign royalty in exile during the war, many of whom resided at Rideau Hall. Among the royal guests were Crown Prince Olav and Crown Princess Martha of Norway; Grand Duchess Charlotte and Prince Felix of Luxembourg; King Peter II of Yugoslavia; King George II of Greece; Empress Zita of Austria and her daughters; as well as Crown Princess Juliana of the Netherlands and her daughters, Princesses Beatrix and Irene. While in Ottawa, Juliana gave birth to her third daughter, Margriet, at the Civic Hospital, where the delivery room was temporarily declared as extraterritorial soil to ensure that the Princess would have only Dutch nationality. At the same time, the former Empress of Austria and Queen of Hungary, Zita Bourbon-Parma, moved from Nazi occupied Belgium to Quebec City, so that her daughters could continue their education in French; one graduated from Laval University. Quebec was also the wartime home of Zita's sister-in-law, Grand Duchess of Luxembourg Joséphine-Charlotte. Olga Alexandrovna, a former Grand Duchess of Russia and the youngest daughter of Tzar Alexander III, left Denmark as Soviet troops drew closer after the Second World War. Olga and her husband, Nikolai Kulikovsky, purchased a farm in Campbellville, Ontario, before moving to Cooksville in 1952, while Olga, who was a talented watercolour artist, exhibited her paintings in Toronto. Olga died in an apartment above a beauty salon in Toronto in 1960.

== Dawn of the second Elizabethan age ==
Mackenzie King's diary traces Princess Elizabeth's deepening involvement in national affairs as she grew into her 20s. He noted, for instance, conversing with the Princess about Canada at an official dinner for Commonwealth heads of government on 1 May 1944 and her presence at a meal, on 24 May 1946, during which the Prime Minister discussed with the King the case of Igor Gouzenko, a Russian spy who had defected to Canada; though Mackenzie King noted George's awareness of many details about the matter, the Prime Minister recorded that he sent the King a copy of Gouzenko's confession.

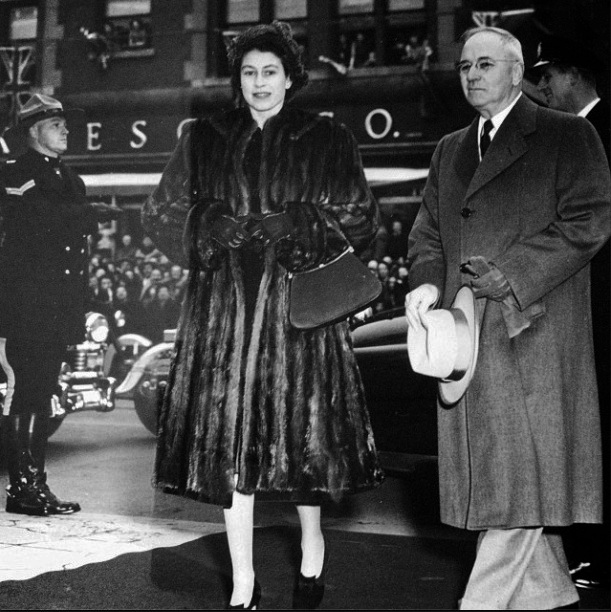
Princess Elizabeth, Duchess of Edinburgh, with Mayor of Regina, Saskatchewan, Garnet Menzies, November 1951

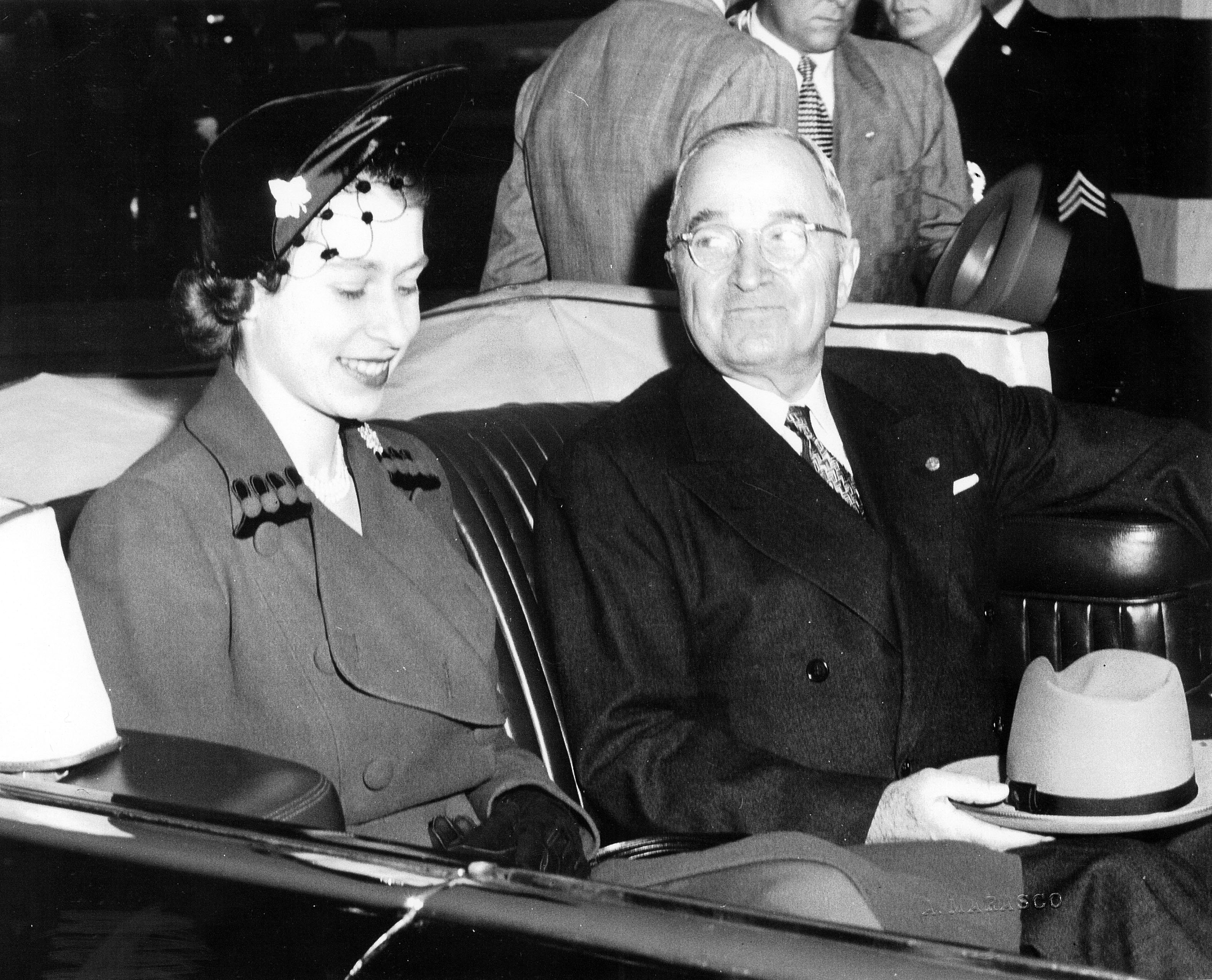
Princess Elizabeth, Duchess of Edinburgh, with President Harry S. Truman, who greeted Elizabeth as a "Canadian princess"

On 9 July 1947, Mackenzie King received both notice of Princess Elizabeth's wish to marry Philip Mountbatten and a request for the Canadian Privy Council's approval, as required by the Royal Marriages Act, 1772. The Cabinet (as a quorum of the Privy Council) gave its blessing and the Princess married Philip (made Duke of Edinburgh on the wedding day) in November of the same year, in a ceremony that attracted the attention of Canadians hungry for good news after the dark years of the war. The King-in-Council presented the newlyweds with a canoe and Elizabeth with a mink-fur coat (which she wore while in Canada for decades after).

The Duke and Duchess of Edinburgh toured Canada from coast-to-coast-and-back in late 1951. With her, the Princess brought a draft accession proclamation, in case the King, who was already ill at the time, should die while Elizabeth was in Canada. Among the many activities the royal couple took part in, they attended their first hockey game at Maple Leaf Gardens in Toronto and enjoyed a square dance at Rideau Hall. The Princess and Philip also crossed into the United States to pay an official visit to President Harry S. Truman, who greeted Elizabeth as a "Canadian princess" at the reception she hosted at the Canadian embassy in Washington, DC.

Having suffered for some time with lung cancer, George VI eventually failed to recover from a pneumonectomy and died of a coronary thrombosis in his sleep on 6 February 1952, at Sandringham House, while Princess Elizabeth was in Kenya. The monarch's passing—which, despite his health, still caught Canadians off-guard—was communicated via cable between the late King's Private Secretary, Alan Lascelles, and Thibaudeau Rinfret, who was acting as Administrator of the Canadian government between the departure of Governor General the Earl of Tunis and the swearing-in of Tunis' replacement, Vincent Massey, who was in London at the time; the telegram read, "profoundly regret to state that His Majesty King George the Sixth passed away peacefully in his sleep early this morning." Rinfret immediately issued on the same day a proclamation of the King's death and the accession of Elizabeth II as Canada's queen, making Canada the first place in which this was done; her proclamation of accession for the United Kingdom was not read out until the following day, after which the new monarch met with her British Privy Council for the first time, with Massey in attendance.

With intercontinental air travel having become easier, a number of the new Queen's Canadian ministers flew to London to join Governor General-designate Vincent Massey at the funeral in London. The Prime Minister remained in Ottawa to take part in a wreath-laying ceremony on Parliament Hill. The date was not designated as a statutory holiday in all provinces, however; in others, it was left to the municipalities or businesses to decide whether or not to close for the day and not all did. As televisions were still a rarity in Canada, most listened to the funeral service in London by radio broadcast.

Wearing a gown that was, along with the floral emblems of the other countries of the Commonwealth, embroidered with Canada's maple leaf in green silk and gold bullion thread veined with crystal, the Queen was crowned at Westminster Abbey on 2 June 1953, in a ceremony that included, like the Queen's dress, Canadian symbols and participants. The prime ministers and leading citizens of Canada were present in the abbey, among representatives of other Commonwealth and foreign states, and the ceremony was also, at the Queen's request, broadcast around the world on television; three times as the event carried on, Royal Air Force Canberra jet bombers flew film footage of the coronation to Canada for play on the Canadian Broadcasting Corporation, making the first ever non-stop flights between the United Kingdom and the Canadian mainland. Guests at the ceremony, television viewers, and radio listeners heard Elizabeth swear a revised Coronation Oath, wherein she reaffirmed her dedication expressed earlier in South Africa and swore to "govern the peoples of [...] Canada [...] according to their respective laws and customs." The separate mention of Canada mirrored the granting of royal assent, the day previous, to the Royal Style and Titles Act, which gave Elizabeth a distinctly Canadian title.

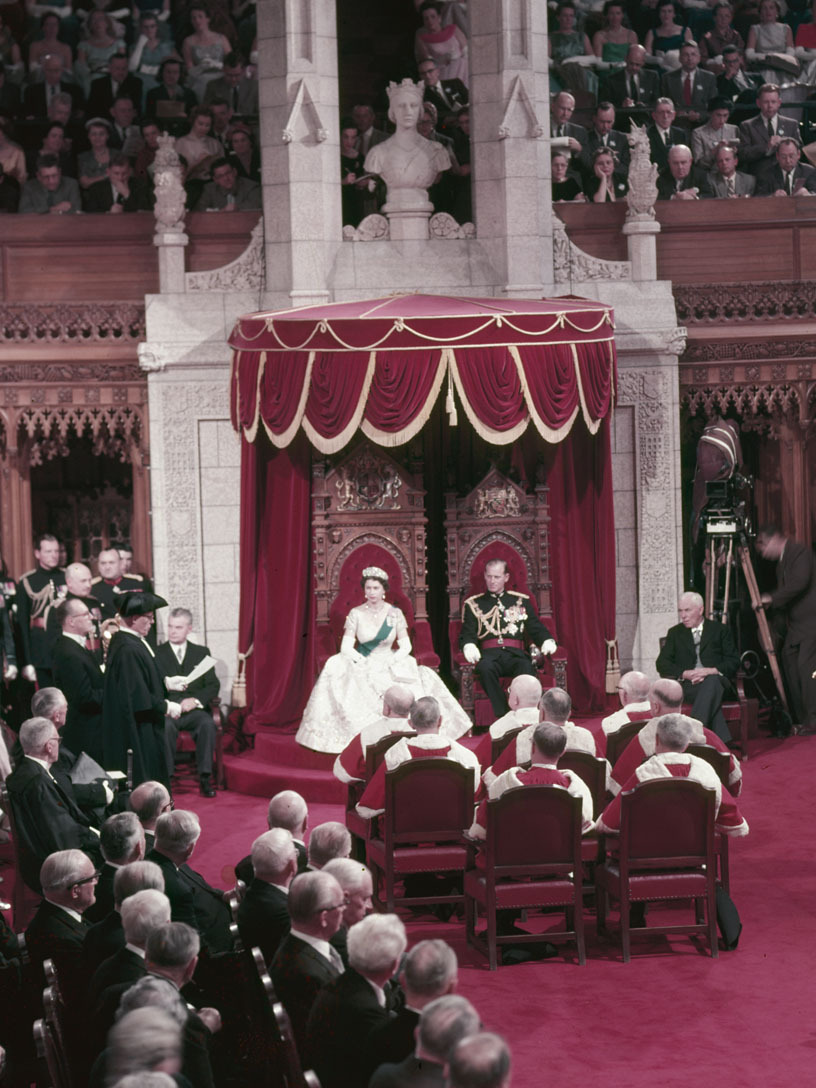
Queen Elizabeth II, wearing her coronation gown, with Prince Philip during the opening of the 23rd Canadian Parliament, October 1957

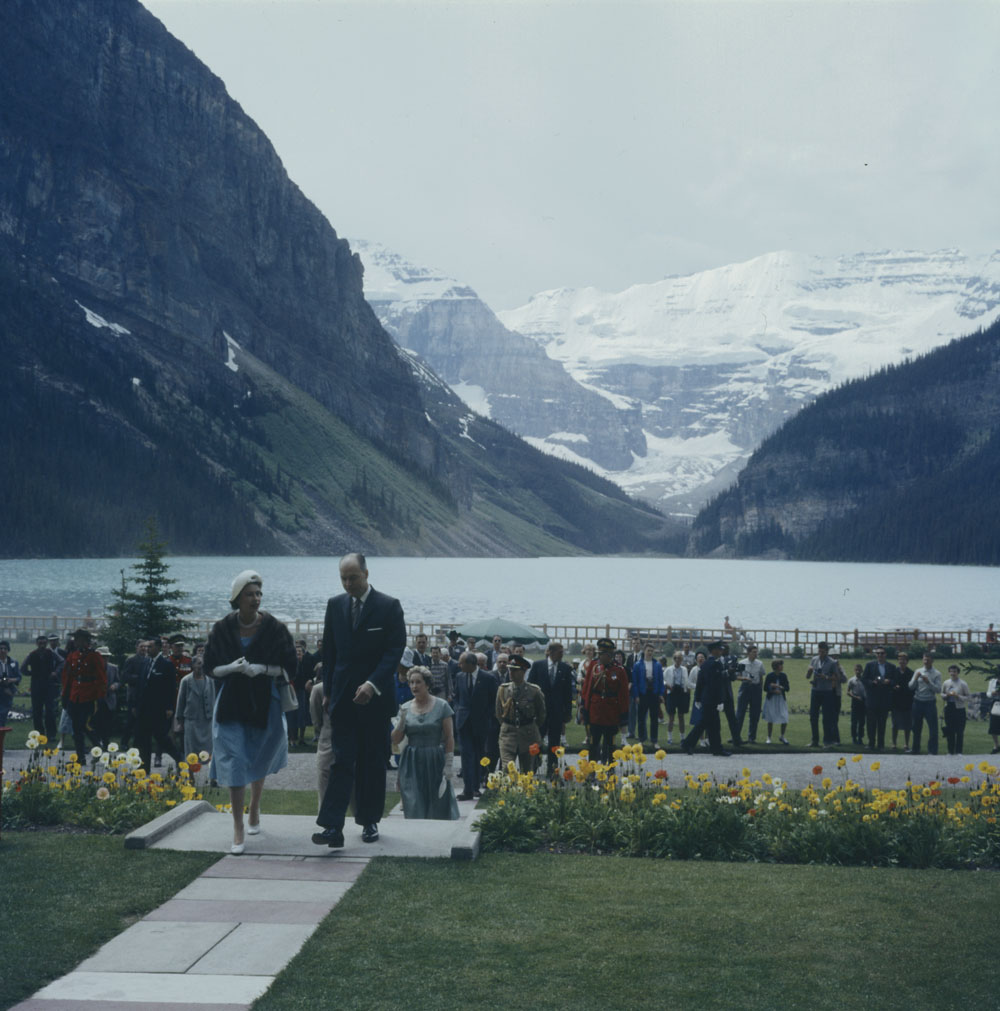
Queen Elizabeth II at Lake Louise, Alberta, July 1959

During a tour of Canada in 1957, the Queen made her first-ever live appearance on television, appointed her husband to her Canadian Privy Council at a meeting of which she chaired, and, on 14 October, opened the first session of the 23rd parliament; some 50,000 people descended on Parliament Hill to witness the arrival of the monarch, though, due to the financial austerity of the times, the pageantry was muted in comparison to what would be seen at a similar event in the United Kingdom. Elizabeth and her husband, accompanied by Canadian Prime Minister, John Diefenbaker, as the Queen's senior minister in attendance, also, on behalf of Canada, paid a state visit to the United States, attending the 350th anniversary of the founding of Jamestown, Virginia, and meeting with President Dwight D. Eisenhower at the White House.

Elizabeth met the President again two years later, at the official opening of the Saint Lawrence Seaway. As she made her way through a full tour of Canada, at the end of which she chaired a meeting in Halifax of her Canadian Privy Council and personally appointed Georges Vanier as her representative in Canada, the Queen crossed the border twice to pay a visit to the United States, stopping in Chicago and Washington. Again, Diefenbaker was her chief minister in attendance; the Prime Minister was insistent that it be made clear to Americans that Elizabeth was visiting them as the Canadian monarch and that it was "the Canadian embassy and not the British Embassy officials who are in charge" of the Queen's itinerary. In this vein, the Queen's speeches in Chicago, written by her Canadian ministers, stressed steadily the fact that she had come to call as Queen of Canada and she hosted the return dinner for Eisenhower at the Canadian Embassy in Washington. Elizabeth also did her part to assist in entrenching the newly emerging Canadian character, ensuring that the Red Ensign (then Canada's national flag) be flown on the Royal Yacht and she stood to attention for the duration of each playing of "O Canada", the country's then still unofficial national anthem, sometimes even joining in the singing.

What was unknown to all, besides Elizabeth herself, including Diefenbaker until he was confided in at Kingston, Ontario, was that the Queen was, at the time, pregnant with her third child. Though her Prime Minister urged her to cut the tour short, Elizabeth swore him to secrecy and continued the journey, leaving the public announcement of the upcoming birth until she returned to London.

== Turbulent decades ==
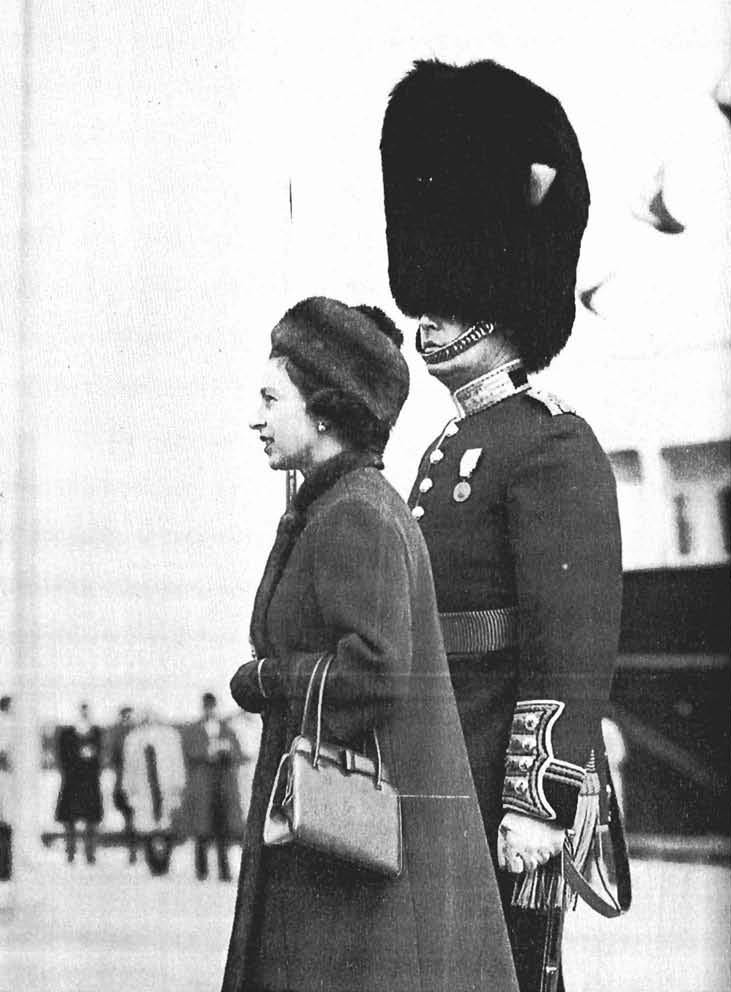
Queen Elizabeth II in Charlottetown, Prince Edward Island, for the centennial of the Charlottetown Conference, October 1964

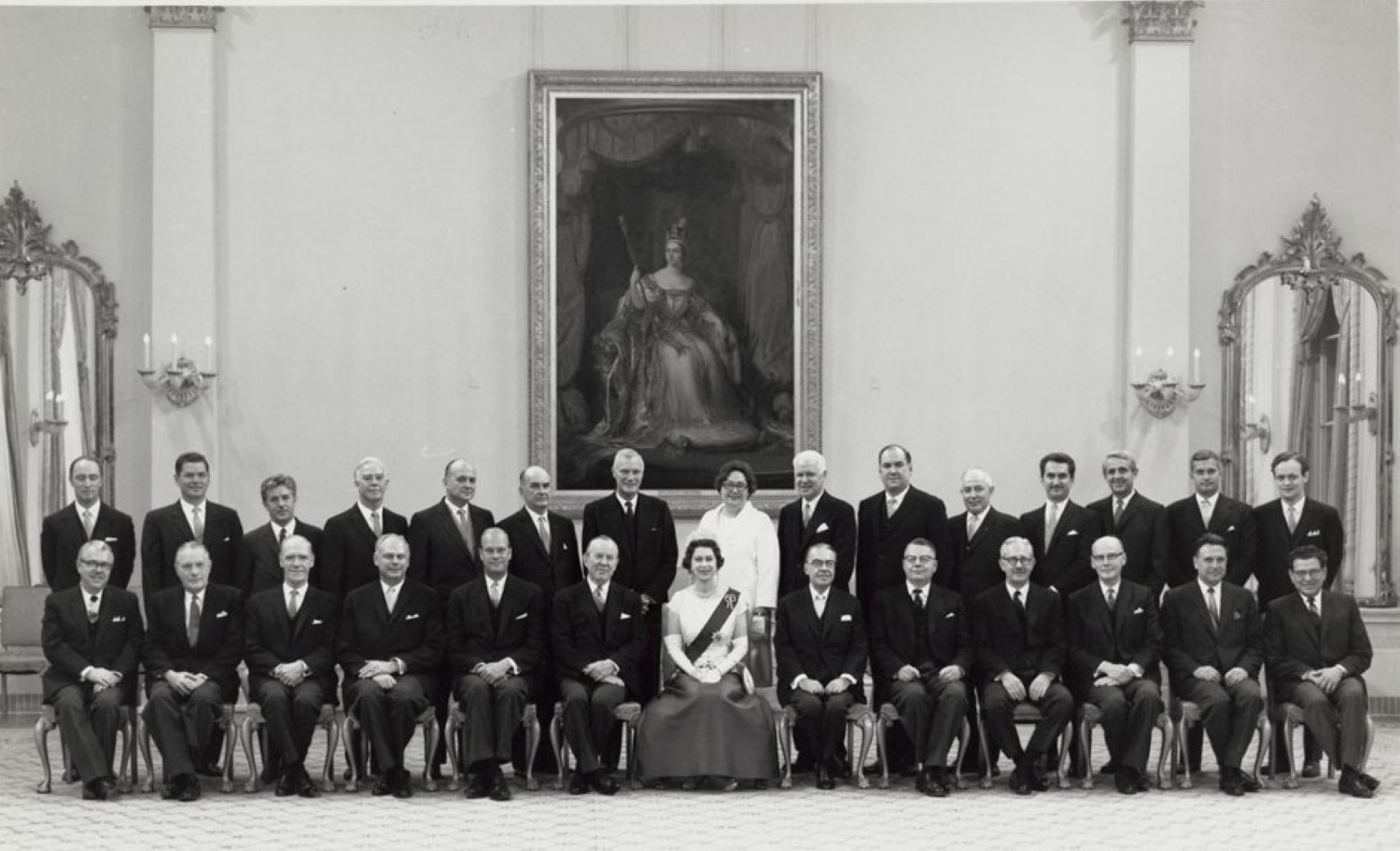
Elizabeth II, Queen of Canada, with her Cabinet, at Rideau Hall, on the centennial of Confederation, 1 July 1967

The 1960s was a decade of swift change in terms of both politics and technology and Canada's monarch found herself affected by both; for instance, Elizabeth II inaugurated the first trans-Atlantic telephone cable—part of one laid to link all the Commonwealth countries—when she, at Buckingham Palace, called Prime Minister Diefenbaker, who was at the Château Laurier. However, the Queen's success in the other field was not as guaranteed; shifts were taking place in Canadian identity, due, in part, to the establishment of multiculturalism as an official policy, increased immigration from beyond the British Isles, and Quebec separatism, the latter becoming the major impetus of political controversy over the Crown.

Those involved with the Quebec sovereignty movement saw the monarchy as a symbol of federalism and/or the British aspects of Canada's history and publicly displayed their contempt for the institution on a few occasions: At the height of the Quiet Revolution, the Quebec press reported that extreme separatists were plotting to assassinate the Queen during her upcoming 1964 tour of the province, as well as to kidnap Premier Jean Lesage's son, should the Queen come to Quebec. Despite fears for the monarch's safety and talk of cancelling the trip, Prime Minister Lester Pearson assured the Queen nothing much would come of the threats, the sovereign arrived as planned and, in a speech delivered, in both French and English, to the Legislative Assembly of Quebec on 10 October, she spoke of Canada's two "complementary cultures" and the strength of Canada's two founding peoples; she stated, "I am pleased to think that there exists in our Commonwealth a country where I can express myself officially in French [...] Whenever you sing [the French words of] "O Canada", you are reminded that you come of a proud race." However, as her motorcade passed through Quebec City, the route was lined with Quebecers showing their backs to her; others booed her and shouted separatist slogans. Though the protesters were the minority in the crowds gathered to see the Queen (the Montreal Gazette reporting that those who opposed the visit were students numbering in the hundreds), the provincial police violently dispersed those demonstrators who took to marching through the streets following Elizabeth's address to the Legislative Assembly, arresting 36, including some who had been there to show loyalty to the Queen. Elizabeth's "calmness and courage in the face of the violence" was noted. Ben Pimlott wrote in his biography of Elizabeth II that "the public reaction in Quebec, and the lack of it elsewhere, led Pearson—who had initiated the visit in the first place—to warn the Queen that the monarchy's days in the Dominion were numbered."

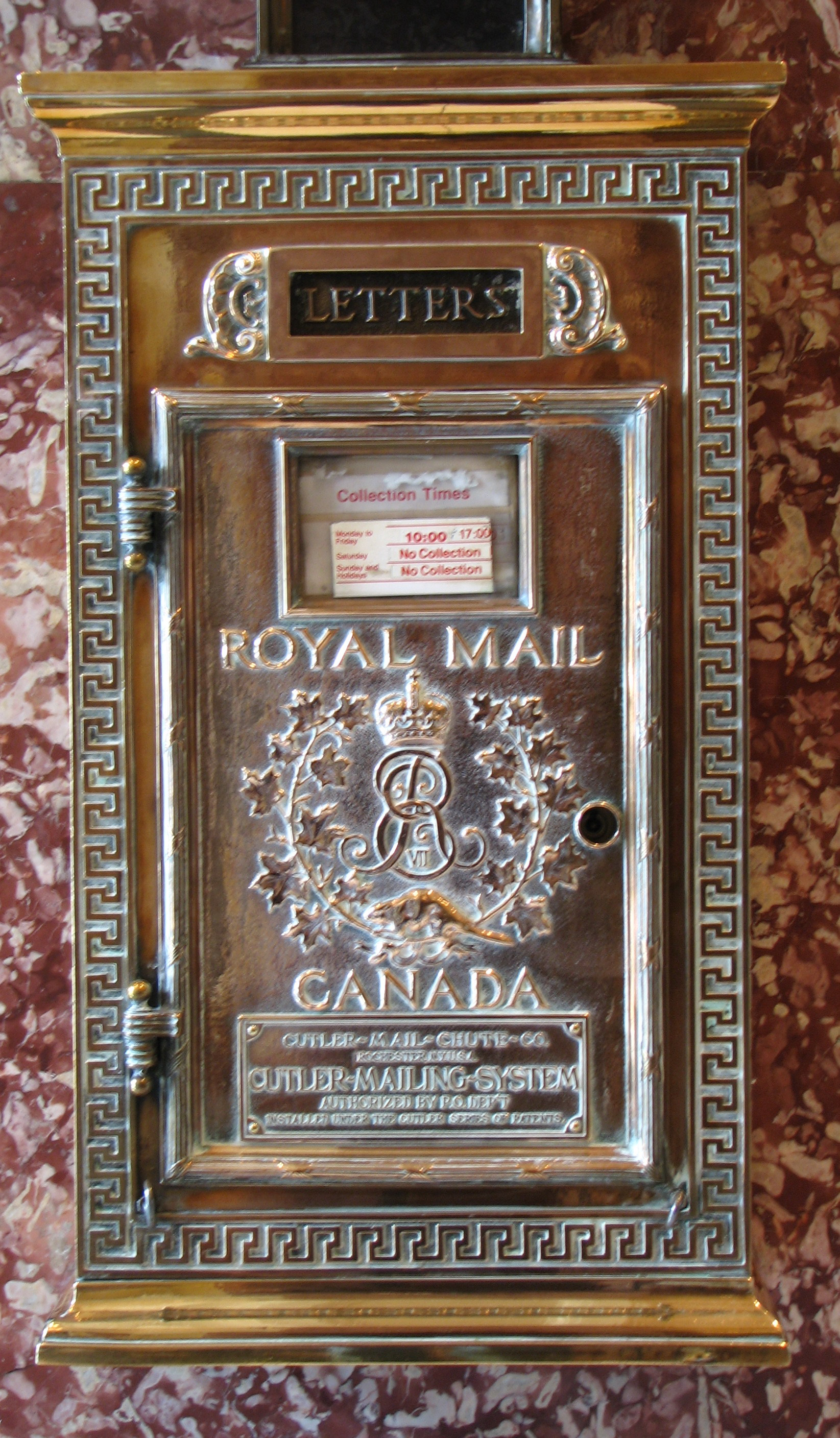
Royal Mail Canada postbox from c. 1900s

Canada Post postbox in 2008

The royal standard of Elizabeth II, introduced in 1962

Several institutions, like the Royal Mail, were re-branded in the 1960s to remove references to the monarchy, while other royal symbols, such as the Queen's personal standard, were created

Despite calls by the Toronto Star for a move to a republic as a mark of Canada's centennial, Elizabeth, accompanied by Prince Philip, presided over the main celebration of the event, taking part in a ceremony on Parliament Hill and touring Expo 67, which had also been visited by her sister, Princess Margaret. Philip opened the Pan American Games in Winnipeg later in July.

A constitutional conference was held in Ottawa in February 1968, at which the delegates from Quebec indicated that a provincial president might suit the province better than the lieutenant governor, but the proposal was not accepted, the overall feeling being that the monarchy "has served us well and that its reform has no great priority in the present round of constitutional changes." Still, during constitutional talks 10 years later, alterations to the Crown were put back on the table by the Cabinet of Pierre Trudeau, which proposed that the governor general be made full head of state and renamed as First Canadian. The provincial premiers, including Quebec's, reacted strongly against these suggestions.

Over the same period, references to the monarch and the monarchy were slowly removed from the public eye. For instance, while a number of royal symbols did remain and new ones, like the monarch's royal standard, were created, the Queen's portrait was seen less and less in public schools, the federal government adopted a corporate identity program without royal insignia, the Royal Mail became Canada Post, and the Royal Canadian Navy and Royal Canadian Air Force were merged, along with the army, into the Canadian Armed Forces. Of the changes made, it was said, "the Crown was to be rooted in the future, not the past; for the historic Crown, with its anthem, emblems, and symbolism, made accessible a past the government of the day rejected," a policy never to be discussed, either publicly or at constitutional conferences, following the rejoinder to Trudeau's 1978 constitutional amendments. John Fraser called it "the process of gradual attrition".

These moves, in combination with the Cabinet's constitutional tinkering and the Prime Minister's antics and breaches of protocol in the presence of the monarch, fostered suspicion that Trudeau harboured republican notions; it was rumoured by Paul Martin Sr. that the Queen was worried the Crown "had little meaning for him." In response to Trudeau's attitude towards the monarchy, the Monarchist League of Canada was founded in 1970 to maintain and promote Canada's status as a constitutional monarchy.

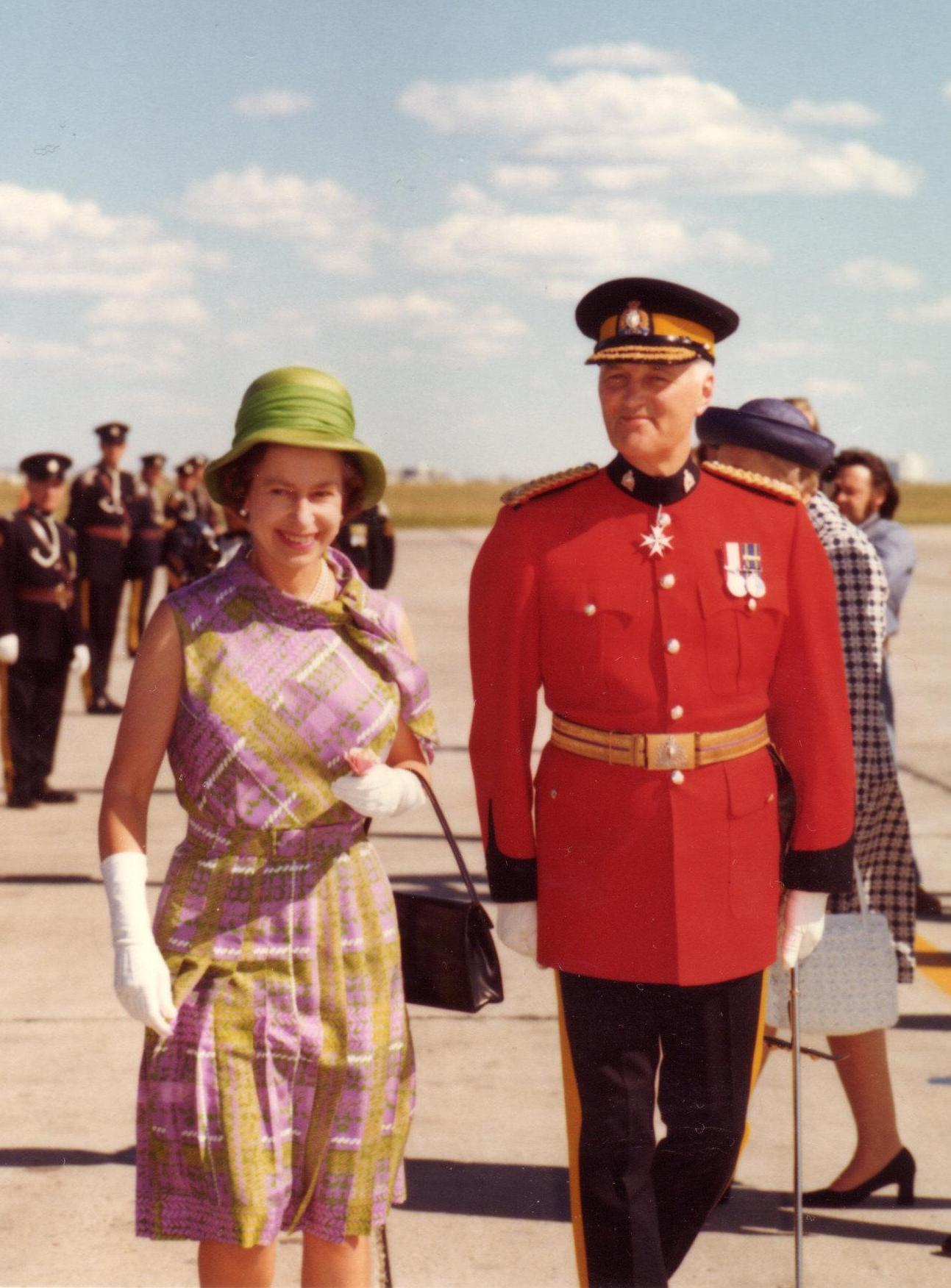
Queen Elizabeth II, with William Leonard Higgitt, in Regina, Saskatchewan, for the 100th anniversary of the foundation of the Royal Canadian Mounted Police, 1973

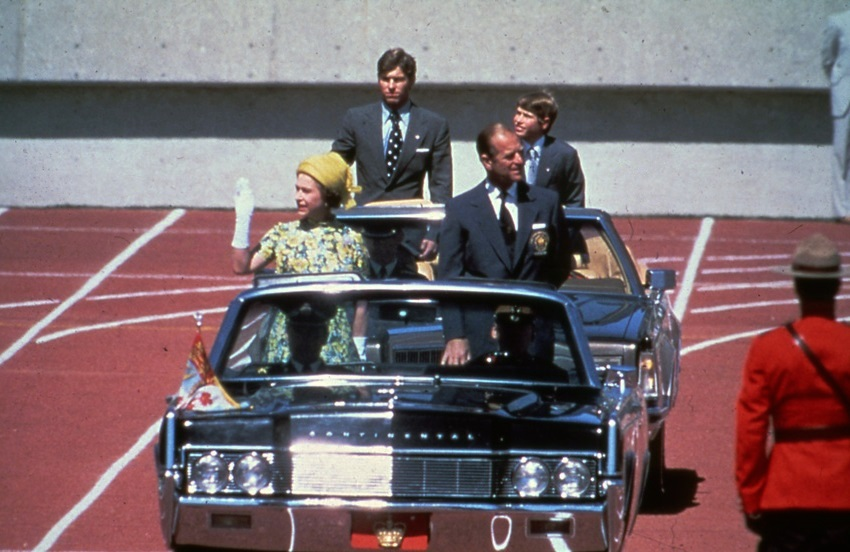
Elizabeth II, Prince Philip, and their younger sons, Prince Andrew, and Prince Edward, at the opening of the 1978 Commonwealth Games in Edmonton

When Prince Edward, Duke of Windsor (the former King Edward VIII), died on 28 May 1972, Canada's diplomats in the United Kingdom attended the lying-in-state at Windsor. In Canada, the official gestures of mourning were minimal: Governor General Roland Michener and Prime Minister Pierre Trudeau sent condolences to the Queen, Edward's niece, and Parliament passed a motion expressing the sympathy of members. None of these messages mentioned the Duke's previous role as King; they simply referred to his times in Canada when Prince of Wales.

Elizabeth toured the country a number of times during the decade. That which was undertaken in 1970—involving the Queen, the Duke of Edinburgh, Prince Charles, and Princess Anne—to mark the centennials of the creation of the Northwest Territories and of Manitoba, was also intended, by way of the monarch's presence in Inuvik and Tuktoyaktuk, to assert Canadian sovereignty over the north, which was then being questioned by the United States. In 1973, the Queen and Prince Philip travelled to Charlottetown to celebrate centennial of Prince Edward Island and to Regina for the 100th anniversary of the establishment of the Royal Canadian Mounted Police. At the same time she, on Trudeau's advice, attended that year's Commonwealth Heads of Government Meeting—the first held on Canadian soil—initiating the tradition of the monarch attending such conferences, no matter the location. Three years later, Trudeau also, at the urging of Premier of Quebec Robert Bourassa, advised the Queen to open the Olympics in Montreal, which were attended by no less than six other members of the royal family: the Duke of Edinburgh, Mark Phillips, Prince Edward, Prince Andrew, Prince Charles, and Princess Anne, who competed in the games for the United Kingdom. Then, the following year, the Queen, accompanied by her husband, returned to undertake a coast-to-coast circuit marking her Silver Jubilee.

Though she decided against suggestions that she allow Prince Charles to attend university in Canada, for worry that he would be hounded by the press, in 1978, Prince Andrew was back in Canada to attend Lakefield College School for a semester, as part of a Round Square exchange programme, and he, too, was presented with a canoe by Elizabeth's Canadian Cabinet.

== An independent kingdom ==
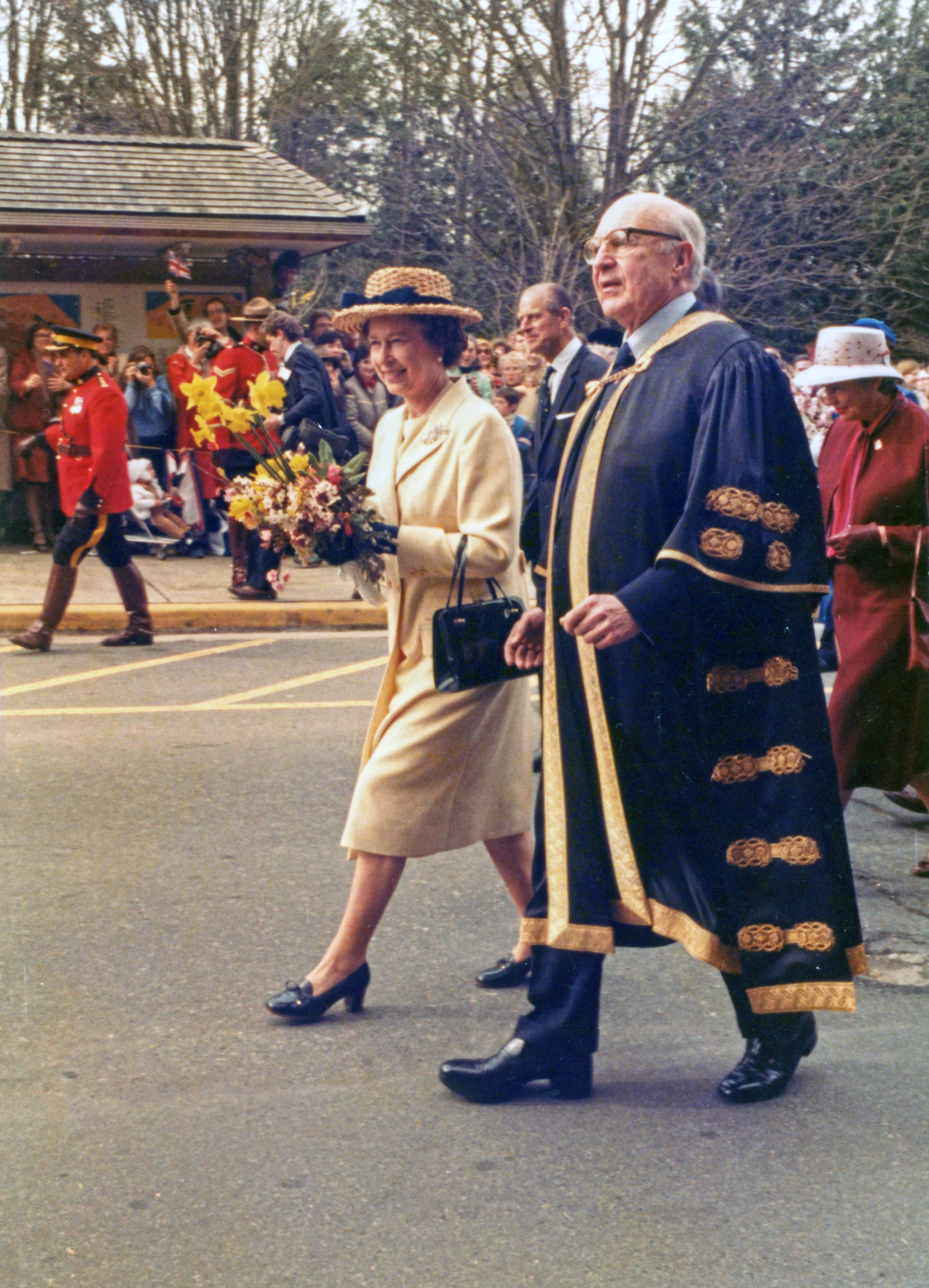
Queen Elizabeth II and Prince Philip, Duke of Edinburgh, at the University of British Columbia in Vancouver, 9 March 1983

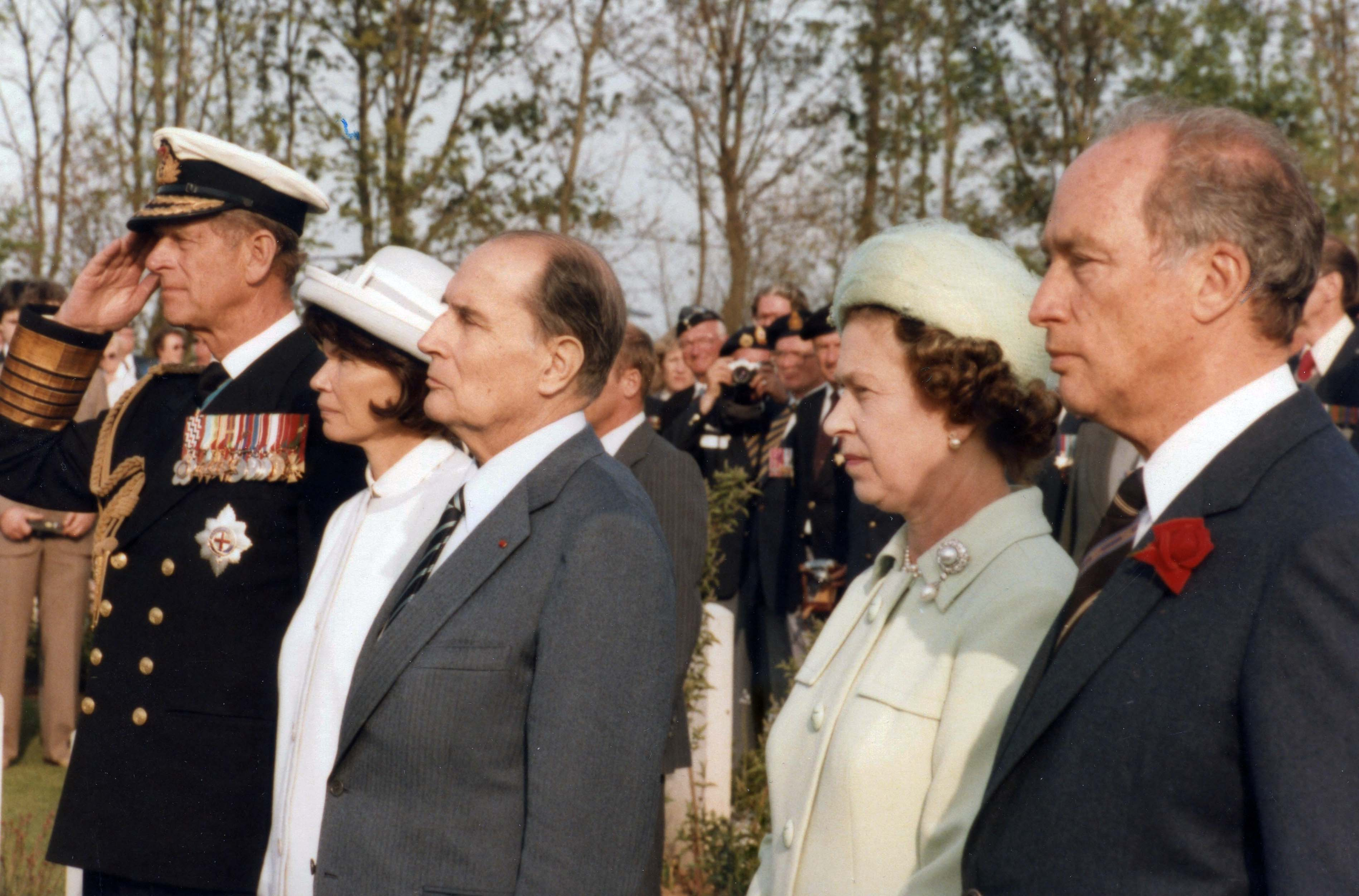
Queen Elizabeth II with her Prime Minister, Pierre Trudeau, and husband, the Duke of Edinburgh, as well as President of France François Mitterrand and his wife, Danielle Mitterrand, at a ceremony at the Bény-sur-Mer Canadian War Cemetery in Normandy, France, on the 40th anniversary of the Normandy landings, 6 June 1984

As the Queen consented to her representative in Canada undertaking more of her duties, it became common practice for the governor general to represent the Queen and Canada abroad on state visits; two successive governors general undertook 12 state and working visits, and Elizabeth performed one, herself, through the 1980s, whereas there had been only three through the 1970s and none the decade before that.

On 29 July 1981, with the required approval of the Queen's Privy Council for Canada, Prince Charles married Lady Diana Spencer in a wedding that attracted the attention of millions of Canadians. The ceremony was attended by Governor General Edward Schreyer and, echoing the gift presented to the Queen and Prince Philip upon their wedding in 1947, Prime Minister Pierre Trudeau commissioned a hand built canoe as the Cabinet's gift for the royal couple. Diana proved more popular with Canadians than the Prince of Wales; it was noted by a former member of Charles' household that, during a 1983 tour of the country, when the Prince emerged from the car, there would be groans, but cheers for Diana when she was seen. Charles' aunt, Princess Margaret, also received negative attention when, in 1981, her visit to the Royal Highland Fusiliers of Canada in Cambridge, Ontario, as their Colonel-in-Chief, was targeted by Irish nationalist protesters. At one of the ceremonies, which were boycotted by three city councillors, there was a scare when a gun barrel was thought to have been seen in the gathered crowd. But, it proved to be a mistake.

The Queen played host to the President of France, François Mitterrand, at the Bény-sur-Mer Canadian War Cemetery in Normandy, France, on 6 June 1984, the 40th anniversary of the Normandy Landings. It was noted Elizabeth's motorcade consisted of only a few cars, whereas the President's "extended to the horizon" and included an ambulance. The Queen was accompanied by Trudeau and the Duke of Edinburgh and the President was joined by his wife, Danielle Mitterrand. After the royal and presidential parties laid wreaths at the Cross of Sacrifice, Elizabeth and the Duke conducted a walkabout, meeting with Canadian veterans and their families.

At the same time, the government was approaching a final resolution on the constitutional issues of the past decades. In 1981, Paul Martin Sr, John Roberts, and Mark MacGuigan were sent to the UK to discuss the patriation project; Martin noted that the Queen had taken a great interest in the constitutional debate and the three found the monarch "better informed on both the substance and politics of Canada's constitutional case than any of the British politicians or bureaucrats." Elizabeth continued to assist with the project until a conclusion was reached the following year, when, in Ottawa on 17 April, she proclaimed the Constitution Act, 1982, into force, which, among other changes and additions, patriated the constitution, making it fully Canadian law, and entrenched the monarchy in Canada; any change to the position of the monarch or the viceroys thenceforth required the consent of the federal and all 10 provincial legislatures. Trudeau commented in his memoir, "I always said it was thanks to three women that we were eventually able to reform our constitution[, including] the Queen, who was favourable [...] I was always impressed not only by the grace she displayed in public at all times, but by the wisdom she showed in private conversation."

However, the terms under which the constitution was patriated had not been agreed to by the Cabinet of Quebec, headed by Premier René Lévesque, a move that was viewed by Quebec sovereigntists as a betrayal. The Queen, aware this was the first time in Canadian history that a major constitutional change had been made without the agreement of the Quebec government, privately expressed to journalists her regret that Quebec was not part of the settlement.

Queen Elizabeth, the Queen Mother, dedicates the Flame of Hope at Banting House, in London, Ontario, 7 July 1989

In 1987, after the first agreements were reached among the 11 prime ministers in Canada on the Meech Lake Accord—which attempted to bring Quebec governmental support to the patriated constitution by introducing further amendments—the Queen made a rare foray into political matters when she publicly expressed on 22 and 23 October her personal support for the plan. She received criticism from opponents of the accord and Pierre Trudeau did not arrive for an official lunch with the Queen on 24 October. Also in 1987, Prince Andrew toured Canada with, for the first time, his wife, Sarah, Duchess of York, who proved popular with Canadians and relaxed among them. The royal couple spent 18 days canoeing through the Canadian north and the Duchess later reminisced that "Canada is like my second home." She also revealed in 2009 that, sometime during her marriage to the Duke of York, he had been offered the position of governor general of Canada; the couple agreed to decline and the Duchess speculated in hindsight that the choice may have ultimately been a contributing factor in their eventual divorce in 1996. The idea had also been floated that Canada abandon its status as a Commonwealth realm but retain a separate monarchy with Prince Andrew as king of Canada; this proposal, too, was never pursued.

The Queen undertook another tour of Canada in 1990, a trip originally planned for her to put the royal sign-manual to the constitutional amendment that would have implemented the Meech Lake Accord's plans, including recognising Quebec to be a distinct society. The accord, however, had failed, which inspired fears for the unity of Canada. At Canada Day celebrations on Parliament Hill, Elizabeth addressed the crowds, stating, "it is my fondest wish [...] that Canadians come together and remain together [...] I and members of my family have been with you on many special days in the life of this country [...] Canada is a country that has been blessed beyond most countries in the world. It is a country worth working for."

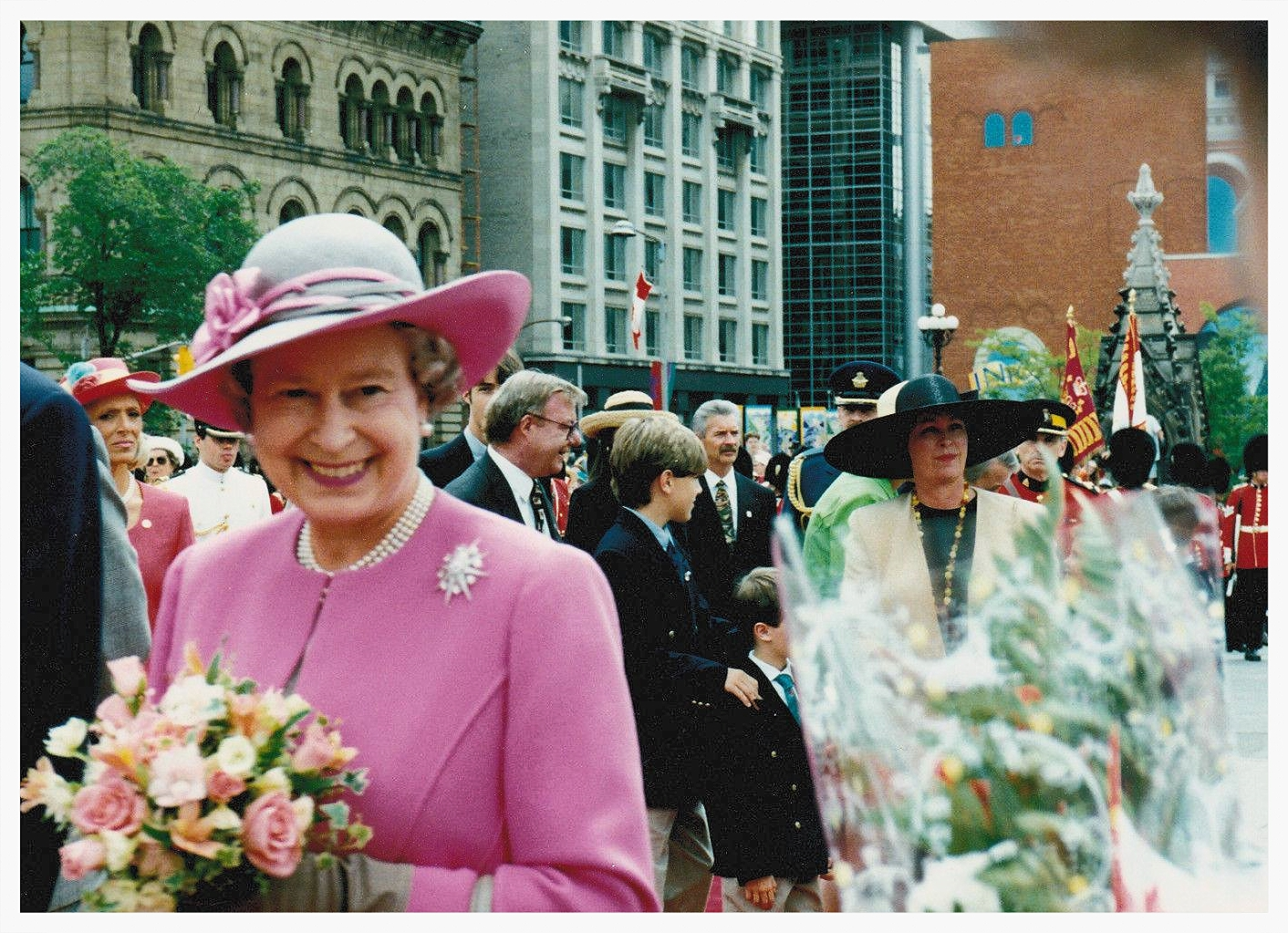
Queen Elizabeth II on Parliament Hill in Ottawa, Ontario, in 1992, to mark the 125th anniversary of Confederation and her 40th year as Queen of Canada

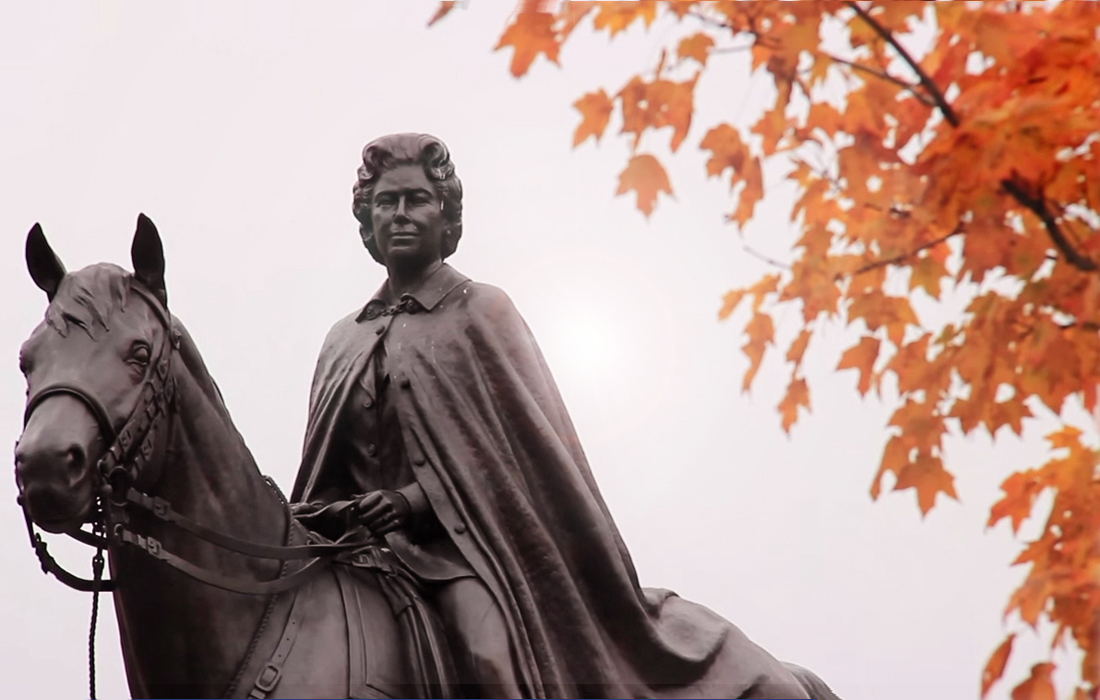
The statue depicting Queen Elizabeth II riding Centenial, which was then located on Parliament Hill (presently at the main gate of Rideau Hall), was unveiled by the Queen on Canada Day, 1992

Despite the Queen's pleas, nationalism in Quebec gained vigour and another referendum on departure from Canada was held in 1995. Five days before the vote, the monarch was tricked into speaking, in both French and English, for 14 minutes with Pierre Brassard, a 29-year old DJ for Radio CKOI-FM Montreal, who was pretending to be Elizabeth's Prime Minister, Jean Chrétien. When told that the separatists were showing a lead, the Queen revealed that she felt the "referendum may go the wrong way," adding, "if I can help in any way, I will be very happy to do so." However, she pointedly refused to accept the advice that she intervene on the issue without first seeing a draft speech sent by Chrétien. Overall, her tactful handling of the call won plaudits from the DJ who made it and the real Chrétien later, in his memoir, recounted the Queen's tongue-in-cheek comments to him regarding the affair: "'I didn't think you sounded quite like yourself,' she told me. 'But, I thought, given all the duress you were under, you might have been drunk.'" On 30 October, the day of the referendum, Queen Elizabeth was on her way to a Commonwealth Heads of Government Meeting in New Zealand and when her plane landed at Los Angeles International Airport, she asked her pilot not to take off until the final tally from Quebec had been announced. She would also see Chrétien in person in Auckland at the Commonwealth Summit.

Peter Donolo, Chrétien's press secretary, leaked on 18 December 1998 that staff in the Prime Minister's Office and other Liberal Party members were working on a plan to abolish the monarchy by the turn of the millennium, though this was denied by Chrétien himself and disapproved of by the majority of incumbent provincial premiers. Save for some journalists, such as Lawrence Martin, who broke the story, the idea was also roundly denounced in the media.

== The new millennium ==
The statue of Elizabeth II riding Burmese (a horse gifted to the Queen by the RCMP) in Regina, unveiled by the Queen during her Golden Jubilee in 2002

It is a privilege to serve you as Queen of Canada to the best of my ability, to play my part in the Canadian identity, to uphold Canadian traditions and heritage, to recognise Canadian excellence and achievement, and to seek to give a sense of continuity in these exciting, ever-changing times in which we are fortunate enough to live.

— Elizabeth II, Queen of Canada, Vancouver, British Columbia, October 2002

The Queen and her husband undertook a 12-day tour of the country in 2002, to mark Elizabeth's Golden Jubilee and thousands turned out to the various occasions. The royal couple stopped in Iqaluit, Victoria, Vancouver, Winnipeg, Toronto, Hamilton, Hull, Fredericton, Sussex, Moncton, and Ottawa. In the capital of Nunavut, Elizabeth addressed the new Legislative Assembly, stating, "I am proud to be the first member of the Canadian royal family to be greeted in Canada's newest territory." In Vancouver, on 6 October, the Queen, accompanied by Wayne Gretzky, and in front of a crowd of 18,000 at General Motors Place, dropped the ceremonial first puck for the National Hockey League exhibition game between the Vancouver Canucks and San Jose Sharks—the first time any reigning monarch, Canadian or otherwise, had performed the task—and, in Saskatchewan, she unveiled a bronze equestrian statue of herself riding an RCMP horse, Burmese. At an official dinner at the Canadian Museum of Civilization in Gatineau, Quebec, the Queen said, "[I wish] to express my profound gratitude to all Canadians [...] for the loyalty, encouragement, and support you have given to me over these past 50 years." However, approximately 100 Québécois protesters were seen when the royal motorcade crossed from Ottawa into Gatineau and Quebec Premier Bernard Landry stated that the provincial government would neither mount any celebrations of the anniversary, nor send representatives to any others, in protest of the Queen's signing of the Constitution Act, 1982.

Just prior to the tour, the group Citizens for a Canadian Republic was formed to promote the replacement of the constitutional monarchy with some kind of republic and attention was drawn to this cause when then-Deputy Prime Minister John Manley became the first-ever federal minister of the Crown to publicly support the end of the Canadian monarchy, saying in an interview that Canada should become a republic upon the demise of Queen Elizabeth II.

In December the next year, after lengthy discussions between the federal government and the Acadian community, Governor General Adrienne Clarkson put her signature on the Royal Proclamation of 2003, which expressed the Crown's acknowledgement of the 1754 deportation of the Acadians and established 28 July as the Day of Commemoration of the Great Upheaval; While not a formal apology, the gesture quelled demands by Acadians that one be issued by the Queen.

The Queen and the Duke of Edinburgh toured Alberta and Saskatchewan in 2005, to partake in celebrations marking those provinces' centennials. The Cabinet of Alberta wished for the monarch to personally grant royal assent to a bill passed by the provincial legislature; however, the constitutionality of the Queen doing so was questioned and Rideau Hall stated the Queen's personal participation in the legislative process would conflict with the federal government's policy of the "Canadianization" of Canada's institutions.

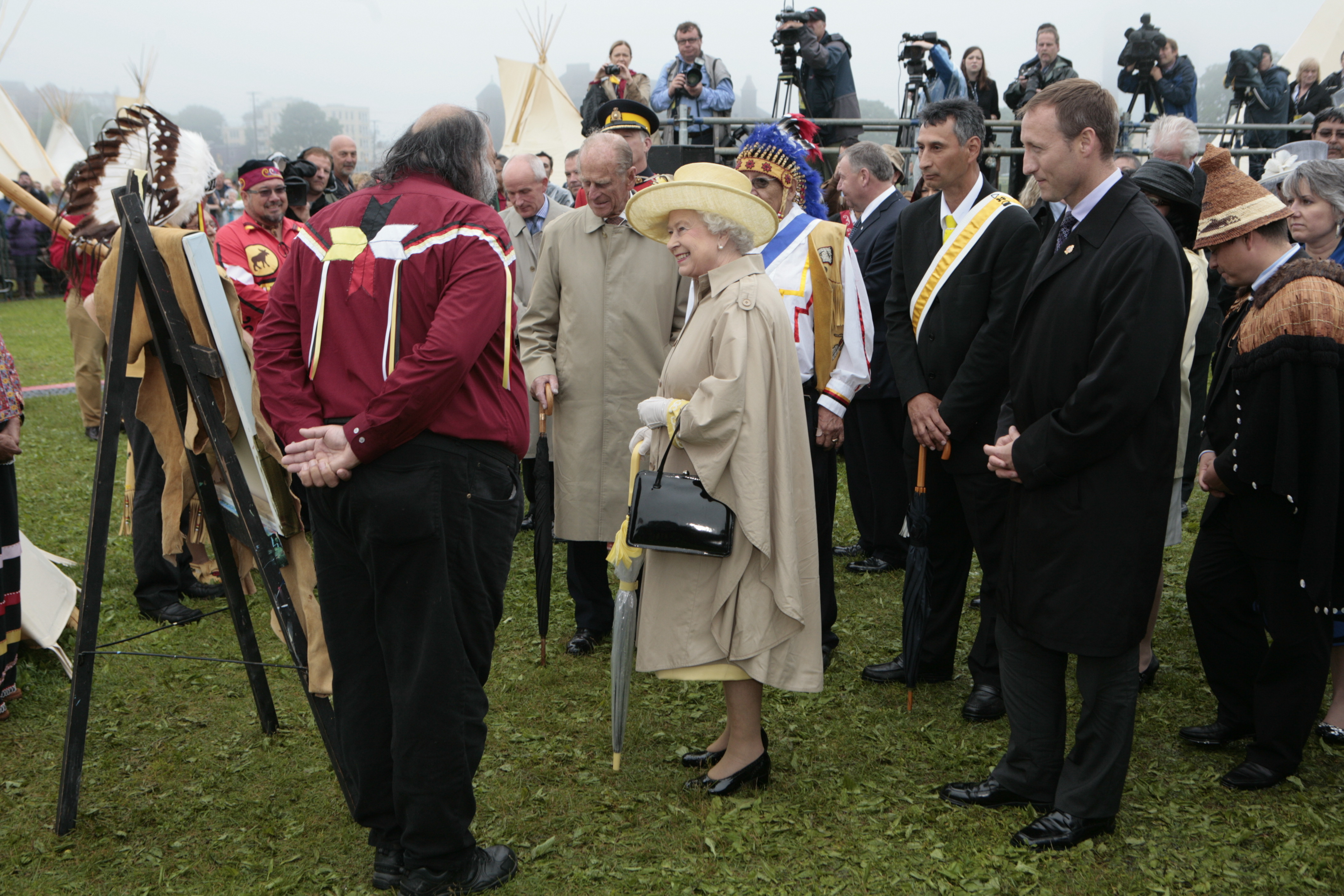
Mi'kmaq leaders present a portrait of Grand Chief Henri Membertou to Queen Elizabeth II in Halifax, Nova Scotia, 28 June 2010

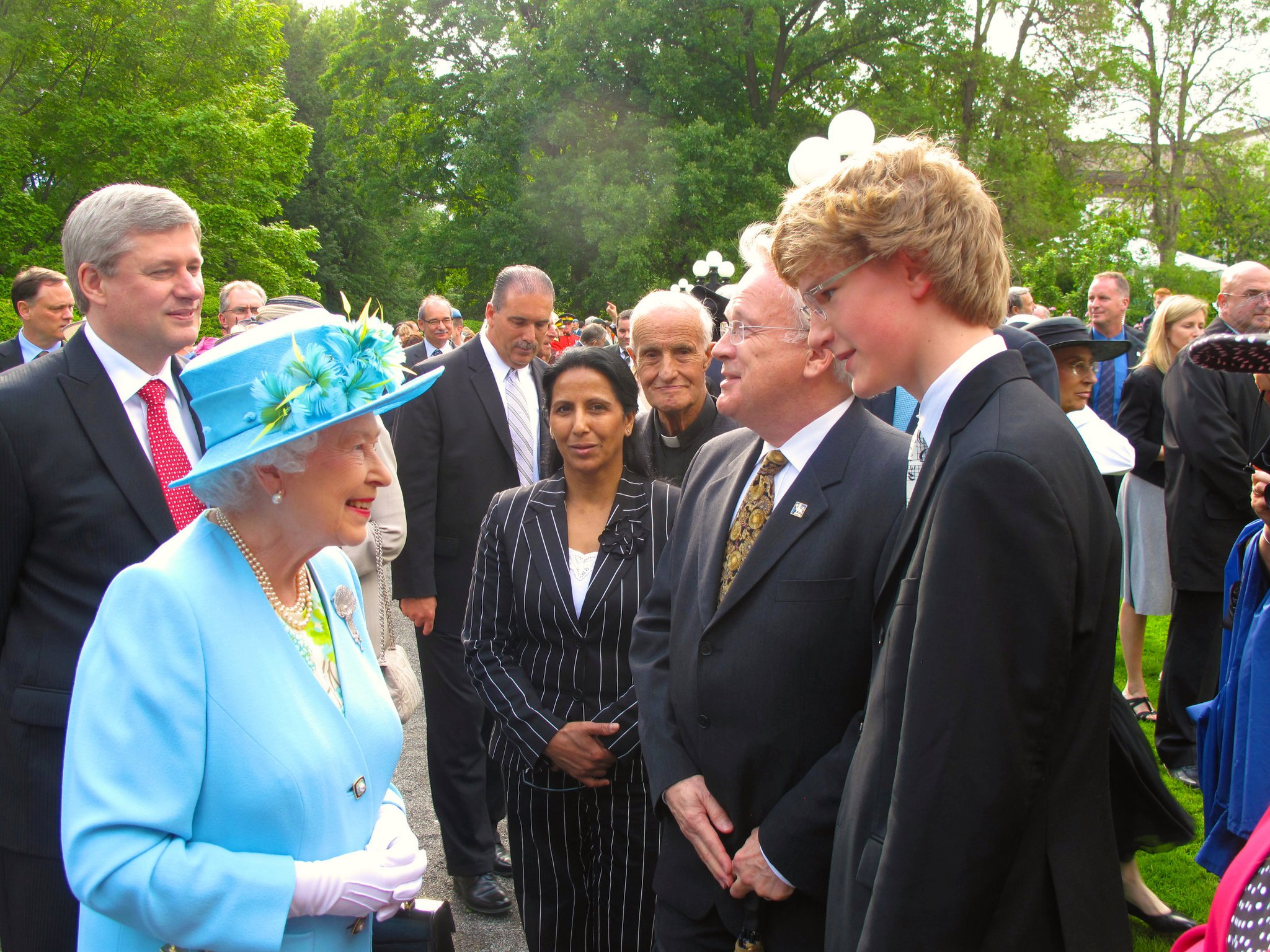
Queen Elizabeth II, with her Prime Minister, Stephen Harper (left), meets Jan Lisiecki following his performance during Canada Day celebrations in Ottawa, 30 June 2010

In 2006, Stephen Harper was appointed as prime minister. In his first address to Parliament as head of government, Harper opened by paying tribute to the Queen and her "lifelong dedication to duty and self-sacrifice," referring to her specifically as Canada's head of state.

Prince Harry arrived in Canada to train, along with other soldiers of the Canadian and British armies, at Canadian Forces Base Suffield, near Medicine Hat, Alberta, ahead of a tour of duty in Afghanistan. Harry went off base during down time and journeyed to Calgary to take in the nightlife. At the same time, Harry's aunt, the Princess Royal, was in Saskatchewan meeting with family members of soldiers killed in Afghanistan. This was part of a wider tour of the province that included her participation in ceremonies to mark the centennial of the Royal Regina Rifles, of which she is Colonel-in-Chief, as well as opening the RCMP Heritage Centre and meeting with First Nations elders at Government House.

Nearing the end of 2007, it was revealed that the Queen was not going to attend the festivities for the 400th anniversary of the foundation of Quebec City, to take place the next year. The Executive Council of Quebec had requested that Ottawa make plans for the sovereign to be part of the celebration, having her follow in the footsteps of her grandfather, George V, who presided over the tercentenary celebrations of the same event in 1908. However, the federal Cabinet advised the Queen not to go, fearing her presence would provoke Quebec separatists, especially after the announcement of her possibly attending incited separatists to promise protests. Governor General Michaëlle Jean attended, instead.

Prince Charles (Now King Charles III) toured Canada with his second wife, Camilla, Duchess of Cornwall (now Queen Camilla) in 2009. Just prior to the tour, Charles had been appointed by his mother as Vice-Admiral of the Royal Canadian Navy and Lieutenant-General of both the Canadian Army and Royal Canadian Air Force. He was also, at Rideau Hall on 10 November 2009, made honorary head of the Canadian Rangers.

The then-Duke and Duchess of Cambridge, just three months after their marriage, toured all regions of Canada in 2011, from the Arctic to the West Coast and the Maritimes. The journey fell on the 225th anniversary of the first royal tour of Canada, by then-Prince William (later King William IV). William and Catherine attended a citizenship ceremony on 1 July—the first time any member of the royal family had done so—and, on the same day, the Canada Day celebrations on Parliament Hill.

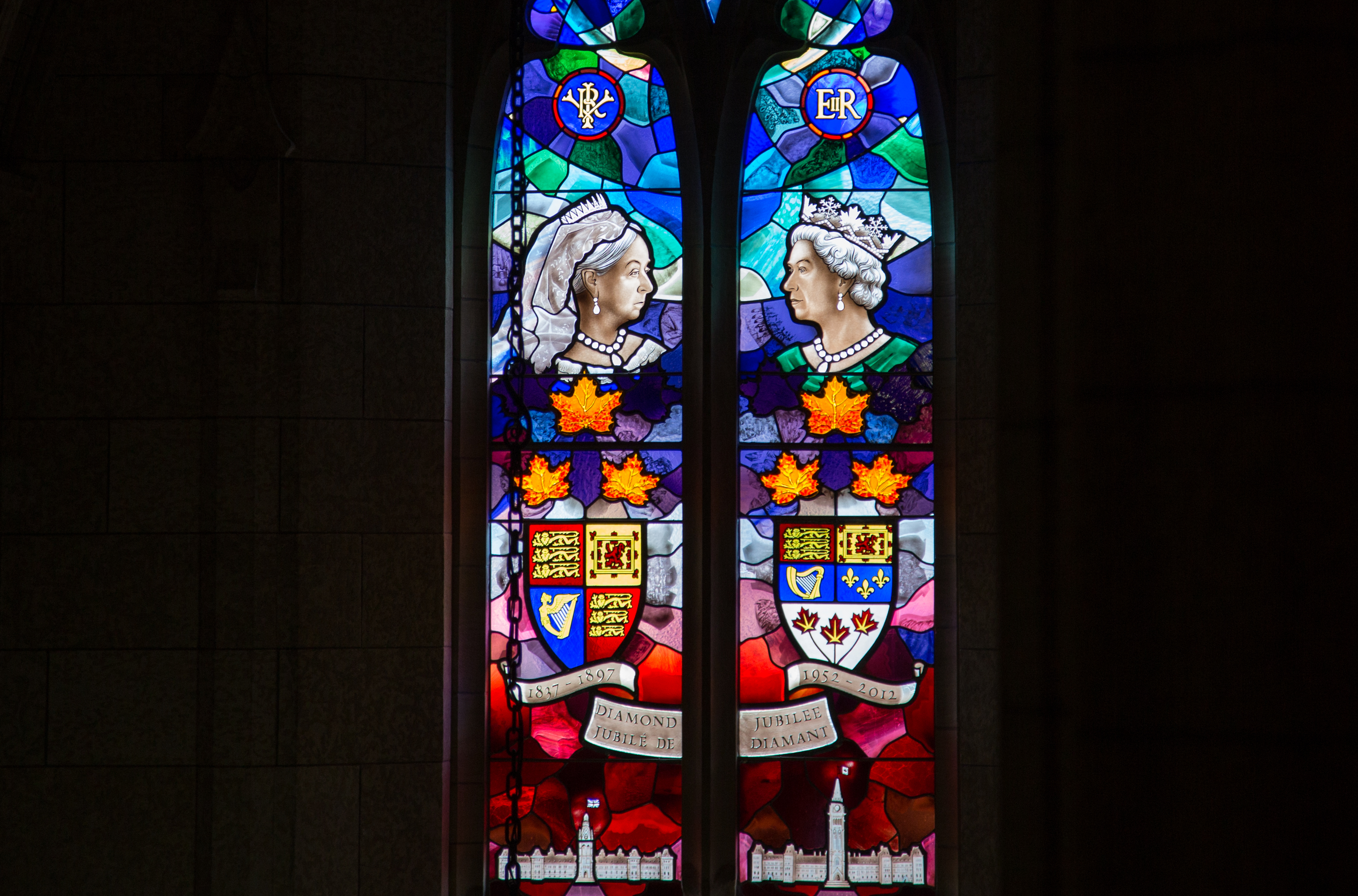
The Diamond Jubilee Window in the Senate foyer in the Centre Block of Canada's Parliament, depicting Elizabeth II along with Queen Victoria, who also celebrated a diamond jubilee

Official celebrations for Queen Elizabeth's Diamond Jubilee began two years before the event, during Elizabeth's tour of Canada in 2010. During it, she, among other things, planted an Amber Jubilee Ninebark shrub—a cultivar created specifically for the Jubilee—in the newly dedicated Queen Elizabeth II Garden outside her official residence in Manitoba and, at Rideau Hall, unveiled a stained glass window, depicting herself and Queen Victoria (the only other monarch of Canada who marked a diamond jubilee), that would, later that year, be installed in the Senate foyer and unveiled by Governor General David Johnston. The jubilee proper started with Diamond Jubilee week, starting on 6 February (Accession Day) 2012, with the raising of the Queen's Canadian royal standard on Parliament Hill and at all government houses and viceregal offices across the country; permission for the breach of protocol (the flag is normally flown only to mark the sovereign's presence) was granted by Elizabeth. Event were organized and educational programs established throughout the country, by federal, provincial, and municipal governments and exhibitions were mounted at museums and institutions from the Canadian Postal Museum to the Canadian Museum of History. The Royal Canadian Mint also issued an "extensive set" of coins to mark the anniversary.

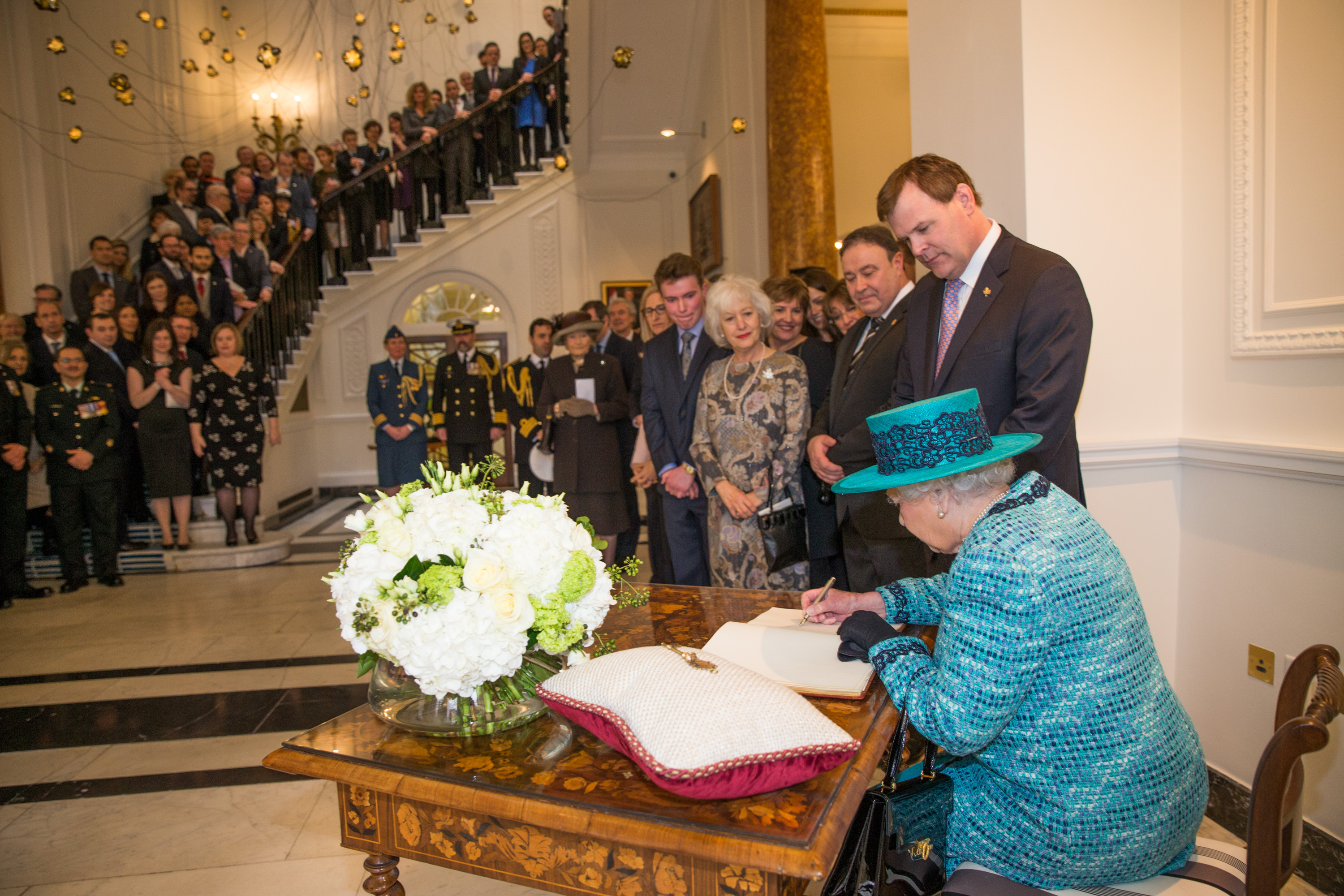
Queen Elizabeth II reopens Canada House on 19 April 2015

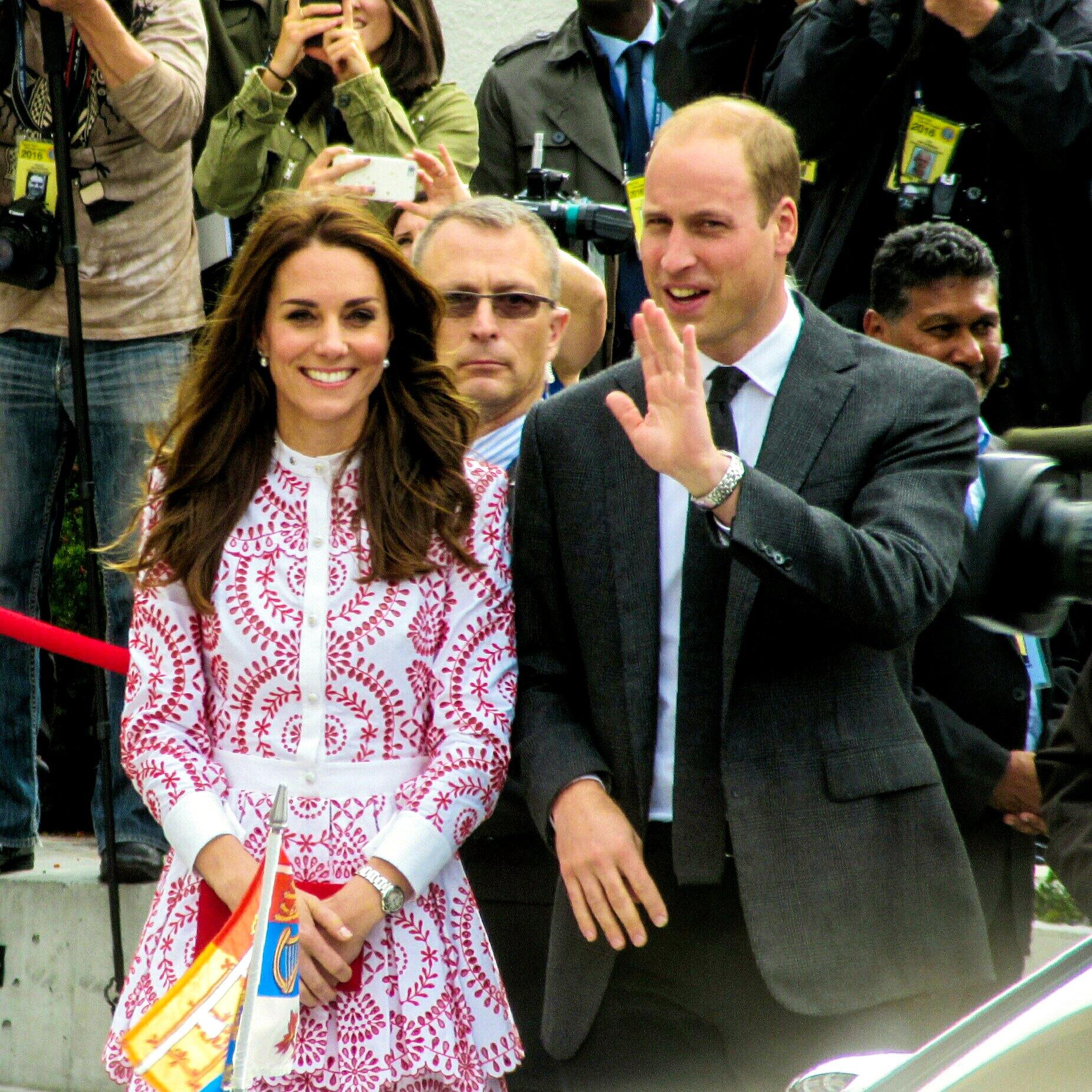
Prince William, Duke of Cambridge, and Catherine, Duchess of Cambridge, at the Immigrant Services Society centre in Vancouver, British Columbia, 25 September 2016

The Queen re-opened a renovated Canada House in 2015. In the same year, on 9 September, Elizabeth became the second-longest reigning monarch of Canada (after King Louis XIV of France), though she was still celebrated as the "longest-reigning sovereign in Canada's modern era". The Bank of Canada, Canada Post, and the Royal Canadian Mint issued a commemorative bank note, stamp, and coin, respectively. A 30-minute performance of music "reflecting Her Majesty's life and times" was played on the Peace Tower Carillon on Parliament Hill. The Governor General, lieutenant governors, and territorial commissioners delivered a loyal address to the Queen.

Elizabeth addressed Canadians by video on the first day of 2017, recognizing the 150th anniversary of Confederation; she said, "throughout the years, particularly since your centennial year, I have watched Canada develop into a remarkable nation. [...] Fifty years ago, on the eve of the centennial, I encouraged Canadians to continue to embody the values of equality, freedom, and inclusion. Today, these values remain deeply rooted in the Canadian experience [...] On this eve of national celebrations, my family and I are with you in spirit. As you prepare to mark this important milestone in your country's history, I send my warmest good wishes to you all." Prince Charles represented his mother, the Queen, at the main sesquicentennial events in Ottawa.

In 2019, Prince Harry returned to Canada with his wife, Meghan, Duchess of Sussex, when the couple decided to spend Christmas on Vancouver Island with their baby son, Prince Archie. During a brief return to the United Kingdom the following year, the Duke and Duchess visited Canada House, on 7 January, to thank Canadians for their hospitality. Soon after, the couple announced that they were stepping back from their roles as senior members of the royal family and moved back to Vancouver Island. Harry, Meghan, and Archie remained in British Columbia until March 2020, when they moved to California.

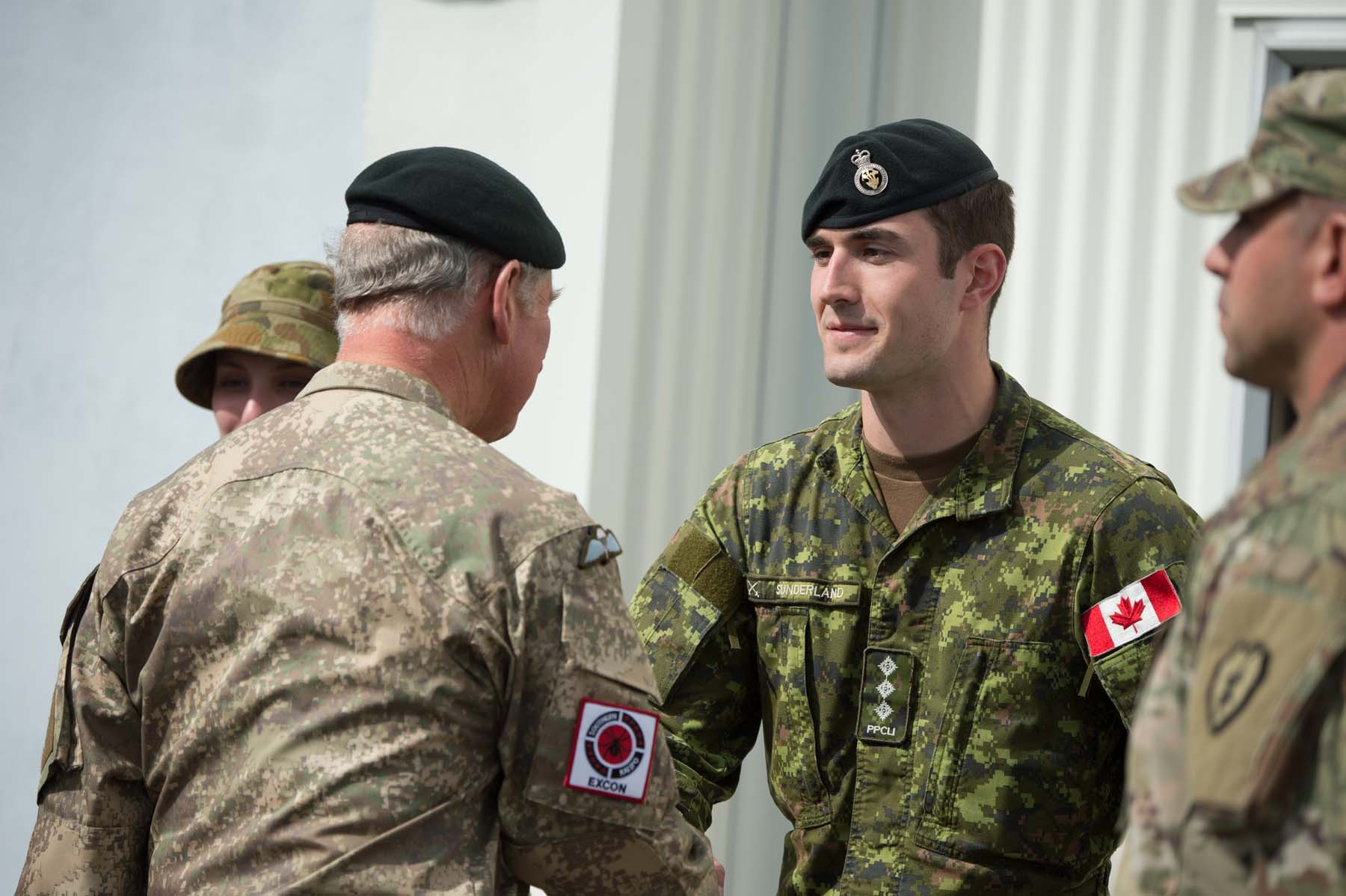
Prince Charles meets Canadian Armed Forces members taking part in Exercise Southern Katipo, 7 November 2015

During the COVID-19 pandemic, the Queen expressed her support for all Canadians and thanks to those who were caring for the vulnerable and providing essential services. As the pandemic waned into 2022, celebrations were mounted around the country and throughout the year to mark the Queen's Platinum Jubilee; the first-ever such event in Canadian history. It was also, though, the first time since at least Queen Victoria's Golden Jubilee in 1887 that the federal Cabinet did not advise the Crown to issue an associated commemorative medal. In response, six provinces produced their own Platinum Jubilee medals; another first. From 2021 into 2022, the subject of reconciliation with Canada's indigenous peoples came to the forefront of the public consciousness, particularly in regard to residential schools. Statues of Queen Victoria and Queen Elizabeth II in Winnipeg were vandalized. On the first National Day for Truth and Reconciliation, Elizabeth made a public statement, saying she "joins with all Canadians [...] to reflect on the painful history that indigenous peoples endured in residential schools in Canada and on the work that remains to heal and to continue to build an inclusive society." In 2021, the Queen appointed Mary Simon as the first indigenous governor general in Canadian history.

== After Elizabeth's reign ==
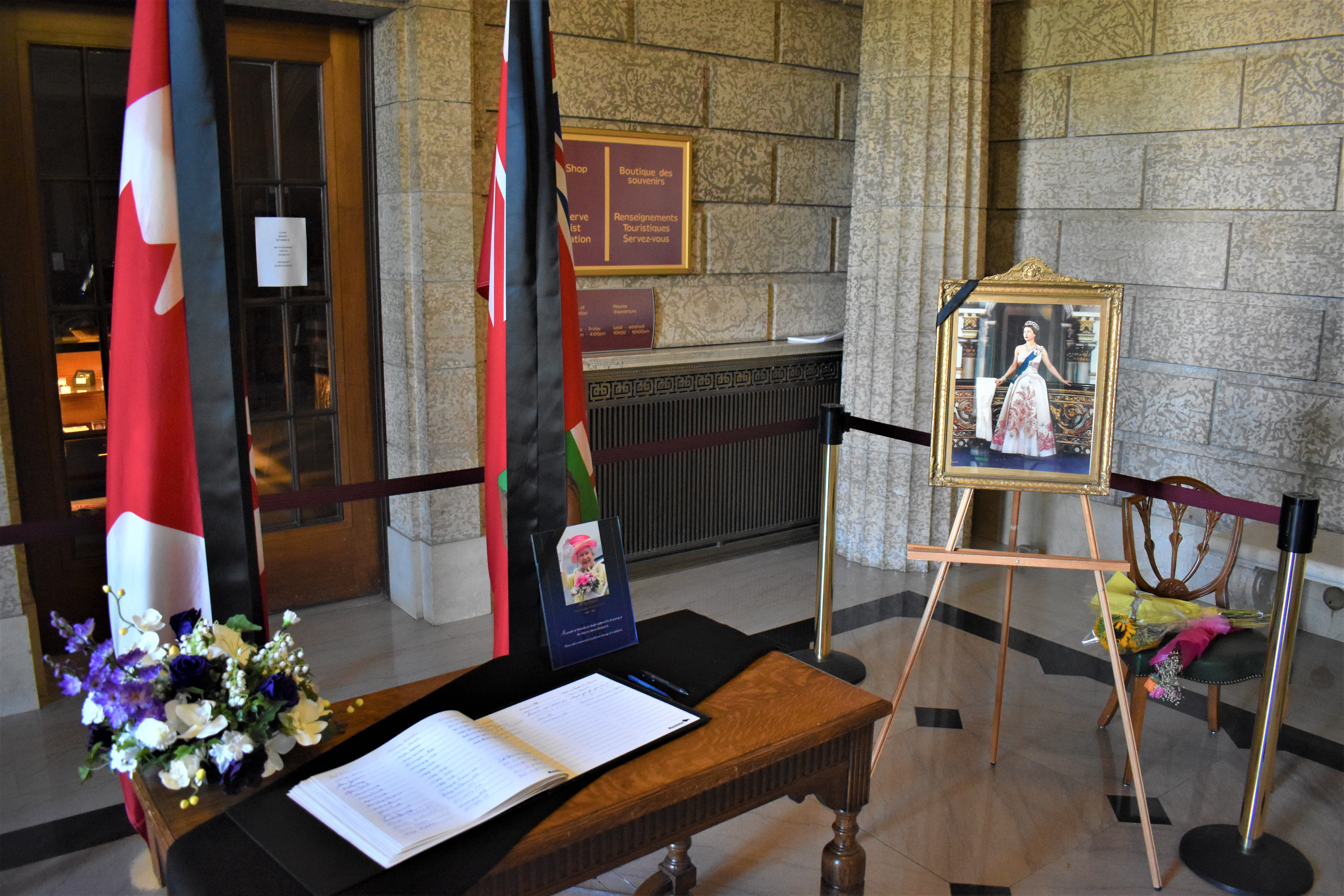
A memorial and condolence book set up for the public at the Manitoba Legislative Building in Winnipeg following the death of Queen Elizabeth II

Queen Elizabeth II died on 8 September 2022, and was succeeded by her eldest son, King Charles III. The Queen's last public statement was on 7 September to express her condolences to, and support for, Canadians across the country in the aftermath of the 2022 Saskatchewan stabbings, saying she "mourn[s] with all Canadians at this tragic time". The monarch's death came as "an existential shock to Canadians who had known only one sovereign" in their lifetimes. Elizabeth's passing, however, did not disrupt daily life as much as those of her predecessors did; business outside of parliaments, ministries, the civil service, and the military largely carried on as usual; with only five day's notice of the national holiday called for the day of the funeral, financial sectors stated they would operate normally, while the decisions of provincial governments were mixed on whether public servants or schools would take the day off: Ontario, Quebec, Saskatchewan, and Alberta chose neither; the Maritime provinces and British Columbia chose both; and Manitoba chose one, but not the other. Still, many Canadians paid tribute at legislatures and city halls and online. The Internet—a technological system inconceivable at the beginning of Elizabeth's reign—allowed Canadians and news media, alike, to follow events in near-real- or real-time, from the moment the Queen's final illness was made known until her death was confirmed by Buckingham Palace, which it did through Twitter and other social media platforms, in addition to the traditional announcements on palace gates.

On 10 September, the proclamation of the new King took place at Rideau Hall, following a formal meeting of the King's Privy Council for Canada, at a ceremony that included heraldic trumpeting, a 21-gun salute and a moment of remembrance for Queen Elizabeth II. The accession of Charles III was the first since the creation of the Canadian Heraldic Authority in 1989, that the Chief Herald read the royal proclamation aloud.

After the 2022 Quebec general election, the elected Parti Québécois members of the Legislative Assembly, briefly joined by members of the equally separatist Québec solidaire party, refused to recite the oath of allegiance to the King of Canada, rendering them unable to take their seats in the provincial parliament. The legislature, with the nationalist Coalition Avenir Québec in the government benches, passed a law that attempted to amend the Canadian constitution to make the Oath of Allegiance optional for MNAs. It remains unclear if the law has any effect.

In April 2023, the Deputy Prime Minister, on behalf of Cabinet, introduced Bill C-47 in the House of Commons, containing provisions that authorized the King to issue a royal proclamation establishing his title for Canada, which excludes a reference to the United Kingdom and the title Defender of the Faith. The bill received royal assent on 22 June 2023; a proclamation of the new title was issued on 8 January 2024. The new title in English is:Charles the Third, by the Grace of God King of Canada and His other Realms and Territories, Head of the Commonwealth.

In May 2023, just days before the coronation of King Charles III, Governor General Mary Simon organised an audience between the King and Indigenous leaders at Buckingham Palace. The three leaders—Assembly of First Nations National Chief RoseAnne Archibald, President of Inuit Tapiriit Kanatami Natan Obed, and President of the Métis National Council Cassidy Caron—were also in attendance at the coronation ceremony on 6 May. The following day, Bellegarde addressed the royal household at the first post-coronation morning service at the Chapel Royal at St James' Palace.

The Canadian Royal Crown

The Sovereign's Flag for Canada

On 6 May, a televised national ceremony took place to mark the coronation of Charles III at the Sir John A. Macdonald Building in Ottawa. Several items were unveiled at the ceremony, including a new standard for the monarch, a heraldic crown incorporating distinctly Canadian elements, and a definitive stamp with an image of the King by Canada Post. It was also announced that an effigy of Charles would replace that of Elizabeth II on Canadian coinage and the Canadian twenty-dollar note. The ceremony concluded with a 21-gun salute and a performance by the Central Band of the Canadian Armed Forces on Parliament Hill. Landmarks across Canada were illuminated emerald green on 6 and 7 May. Tours were offered at Rideau Hall, and the Central Band of the Canadian Armed Forces performed there, while members of the Governor General's Foot Guards performed changing of the guard ceremonies. It was also announced that the government will issue coronation medals to 30,000 Canadians who made significant contributions to the country or their local region.

King Charles III delivering the 2025 Speech from the Throne in the Senate of Canada Building, 27 May 2025

A planned tour of Canada by Charles was reportedly called off after he was diagnosed with cancer. In May 2025, King Charles III, accompanied by Queen Camilla, visited Canada for the first time as monarch and delivered the speech from the throne, the first time a Canadian monarch has done so in person since 1977.

== Monarchs of Canadian territories ==
The line of monarchs who reigned over territories that would become Canadian or over Canada itself begins approximately at the turn of the 16th century. The date of the first establishment a monarchical form of government in parts of the territory which now forms Canada varies: some sources give the year as 1497, when King Henry VII claimed parts of Newfoundland, while others put it at 1534, when New France was founded in the name of King Francis I. Monarchical governance thenceforth evolved under a continuous succession of French and British sovereigns, and eventually the legally distinct Canadian monarchy. Since John Cabot first lay claim to Canada in the name of Henry VII, there have been 33 sovereigns of Canada, including two sets of co-sovereigns.

== See also ==
- History of Canada
- History of monarchy in Alberta
- History of monarchy in British Columbia
- History of monarchy in Manitoba
- History of monarchy in New Brunswick
- History of monarchy in Newfoundland and Labrador
- History of monarchy in Nova Scotia
- History of monarchy in Ontario
- History of monarchy in Prince Edward Island
- History of monarchy in Quebec
- History of monarchy in Saskatchewan
- Monarchism in Canada
- Republicanism in Canada
- Royal tours of Canada
- History of monarchy in Australia
- History of monarchy in the United Kingdom
