= Exercise Southern Katipo =

Biennial military exercise in New Zealand

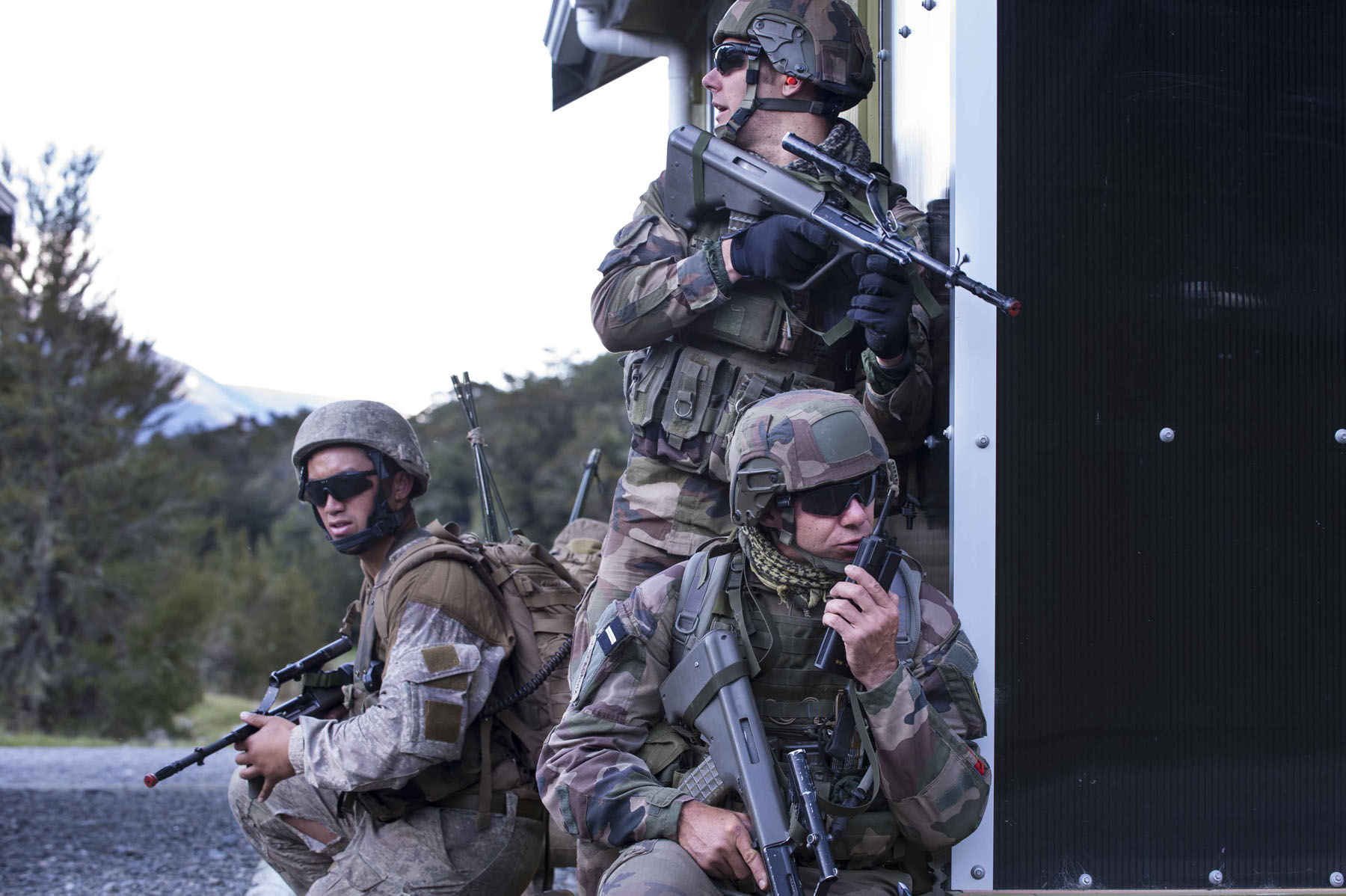
Soldiers during Exercise Southern Katipo 15

Southern Katipo is a military exercise that occurs every two years run by the New Zealand Defence Force (NZDF) within New Zealand. It is the largest exercise of the NZDF. It involves many different organizations including both military and civilian organizations, and even can involve members of the public. A multinational and joint exercise involving air, ground and naval forces, foreign partners have included Australia, Canada, Tonga, Malaysia, Singapore, Timor Leste, Papua New Guinea, Fiji, France, Chile, New Caledonia, the United States and the United Kingdom.
